= Aimee Mann discography =

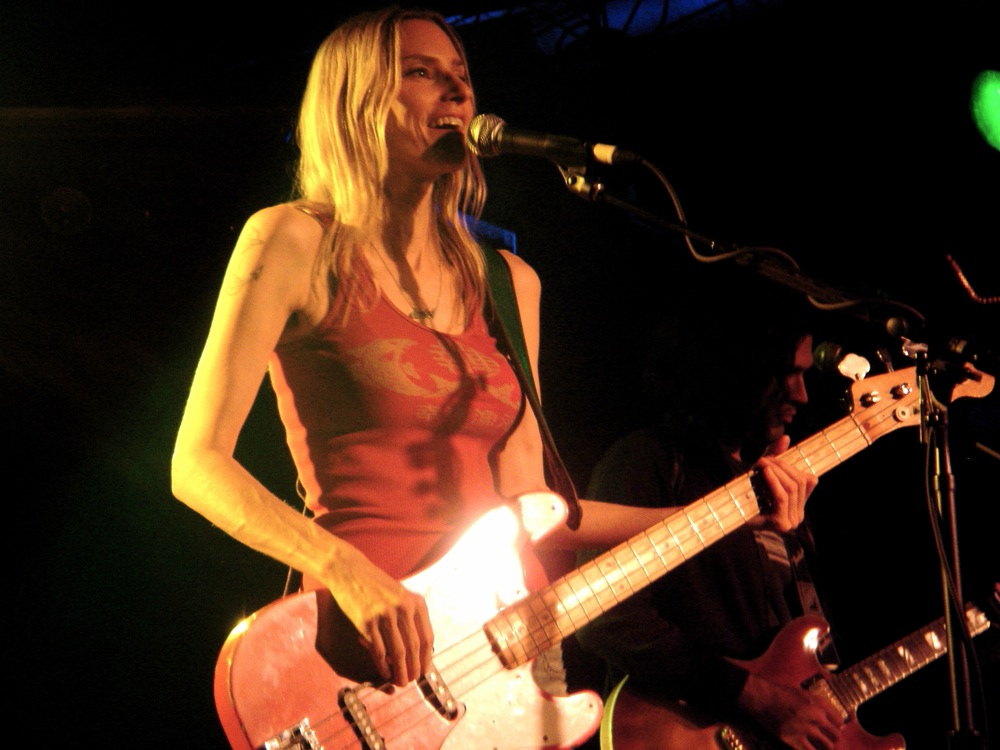
- Aimee Mann in concert on October 15, 2005.
- Studio albums: 10
- Soundtrack albums: 1
- Live albums: 1
- Compilation albums: 1
- Singles: 30
- B-sides: 12
- Music videos: 22

Aimee Mann is an American singer-songwriter who has released several albums since the early 1980s. Originally, she worked in collaboration with The Young Snakes and 'Til Tuesday, before becoming a solo artist. In 2013, she and Ted Leo began performing as the Both. As a solo artist, Mann has released 10 studio albums.

== Albums ==
=== Studio albums ===
List of studio albums, with selected chart positions and sales
Title	Album details	Peak chart positions										Sales
Title	Album details	USA	USA Indie	AUS	BEL (FL)	FRA	GER	JPN	NLD	SWE	UK	Sales
Whatever	Released: May 11, 1993; Label: Imago, Geffen	127	—	—	—	—	—	—	—	—	39	US: 170,000
I'm with Stupid	Released: November 1995; Label: Geffen	82	—	105	—	—	—	—	—	—	51	US: 123,000
Bachelor No. 2 or, the Last Remains of the Dodo	Released: May 2, 2000; Label: SuperEgo	134	7	196	—	—	44	—	87	30	— (Note: Bachelor No. 2 or, the Last Remains of the Dodo did not enter the UK Albums Chart, but it peaked at number 14 on the UK Independent Albums Chart.)	US: 230,000
Lost in Space	Released: August 27, 2002; Label: SuperEgo	35	1	193	—	103	30	80	86	18	72	US: 232,000
The Forgotten Arm	Released: May 3, 2005; Label: SuperEgo	60	1	—	98	136	60	143	96	28	84	
One More Drifter in the Snow	Released: October 31, 2006; Label: SuperEgo	—	25	—	—	—	—	—	—	—	—	US: 39,000
@#%&*! Smilers	Released: June 2, 2008; Label: SuperEgo	32	2	—	—	—	—	—	—	40	—	
Charmer	Released: September 17, 2012; Label: SuperEgo	33	6	—	177	—	89	151	—	—	74	
Mental Illness	Released: March 31, 2017; Label: SuperEgo	54	5	—	112	—	69	109	151	—	53	
Queens of the Summer Hotel	Released: November 5, 2021; Label: SuperEgo	—	—	—	—	—	—	—	—	—	— (Note: Queens of the Summer Hotel did not enter the UK Albums Chart, but it peaked at number 18 on the UK Independent Albums Chart.)	

=== Live albums ===
- Live at St. Ann's Warehouse (2004)

=== Compilation albums ===
- Ultimate Collection (2000)

=== Soundtrack albums ===
List of soundtrack albums, with selected chart positions and sales
Title	Album details	Peak chart positions			Sales
Title	Album details	US	CAN	GER	Sales
Magnolia: Music from the Motion Picture (with various artists)	Released: December 7, 1999; Label: Warner Music	58	21	42	US: 500,000 (Gold)

== Singles ==
=== As lead artist ===
List of singles, with selected chart positions, showing year released and album name
Title	Year	Peak chart positions					Album
Title	Year	US	US AAA	US Alt.	AUS	UK	Album
"I Should've Known"	1993	—	—	16	—	55	Whatever
"Stupid Thing"	1993	—	—	—	—	47	Whatever
"I Should've Known" (reissue)	1994	—	—	—	—	45	Whatever
"Say Anything"	1994	—	—	—	—	—	Whatever
"That's Just What You Are"	1994	93	—	24	—	—	I'm with Stupid
"Choice in the Matter"	1995	—	12	—	—	—	I'm with Stupid
"Long Shot"	1996	—	—	—	86	126	I'm with Stupid
"You Could Make a Killing"	1996	—	—	—	—	—	I'm with Stupid
"Amateur"	1997	—	—	—	—	—	I'm with Stupid
"Superball"	1997	—	—	—	—	—	I'm with Stupid
"Save Me"	2000	—	—	—	—	88	Magnolia: Music from the Motion Picture
"Wise Up"	2000	—	—	—	—	—	Magnolia: Music from the Motion Picture
"The Christmas Song"	2000	—	—	—	—	—	non-album single
"Red Vines"	2001	—	21	—	—	—	Bachelor No. 2
"Calling It Quits"	2001	—	—	—	—	—	Bachelor No. 2
"How Am I Different"	2001	—	—	—	—	—	Bachelor No. 2
"Ghost World"	2001	—	—	—	—	—	Bachelor No. 2
"Humpty Dumpty"	2002	—	—	—	—	—	Lost in Space
"Pavlov's Bell"	2003	—	—	—	—	—	Lost in Space
"Going Through the Motions"	2005	—	18	—	—	—	The Forgotten Arm
"Video"	2005	—	—	—	—	—	The Forgotten Arm
"31 Today"	2007	—	—	—	—	—	@#%&*! Smilers
"Freeway"	2008	—	19	—	—	—	@#%&*! Smilers
"Phoenix"	2008	—	—	—	—	—	@#%&*! Smilers
"Charmer"	2012	—	—	—	—	—	Charmer
"Labrador"	2012	—	—	—	—	—	Charmer
"Soon Enough"	2012	—	—	—	—	—	Charmer
"Can't You Tell?"	2016	—	—	—	—	—	30 Days, 30 Songs
"Goose Snow Cone"	2017	—	—	—	—	—	Mental Illness
"Patient Zero"	2017	—	—	—	—	—	Mental Illness

=== Collaborations ===
- 1987 – "The Faraway Nearby" by Cyndi Lauper (backing vocals) on her album True Colors
- 1987 – "Time Stand Still" by Rush (backing vocals) on the album Hold Your Fire
- 1990 – "Yesterday (You Stopped Crying)" covered by Sarah Brightman on her album "As I Came of Age"
- 1993 – "Under Jets" by Murray Attaway (backing vocals) on his album In Thrall
- 2004 – "Static on the Radio" with Jim White on his album Drill a Hole in That Substrate and Tell Me What You See
- 2004 – "That's Me Trying" by William Shatner (backing vocals) on his album Has Been
- 2005 – "Where's the Party?" by Jim Boggia (backing vocals) on his album Safe in Sound
- 2005 – "How Am I Different" by Bettye LaVette on her album I've Got My Own Hell to Raise
- 2006 – "Ms. Ketchup and the Arsonist" by The Honeydogs (backing vocals) on the album Amygdala
- 2008 – "My Father's Gun" by Elton John. Aimee has been playing this cover at every show throughout her 2008 Smilers tour.
- 2008 – "Hearts" by Tim & Eric (lead vocals) on their album Awesome Record, Great Songs! Volume One
- 2012 – "No More Amsterdam" with Steve Vai on his album The Story of Light
- 2012 – "Bigger Than Love" with Ben Gibbard on his album Former Lives
- 2012 – "All The Times We Had" with Ivan & Alyosha on their album All the Times We Had
- 2012 – Backing vocals on Some Things Never Stay the Same (Mann made the album art for 2011's Starting from Nowhere)
- 2017 – "No Love" with Scott Miller (co-written, duet) on the Game Theory album Supercalifragile
- 2021 – "Name of the Game" by Susanna Hoffs on her album Bright Lights

== Soundtrack appearances ==
- 1996 – Jerry Maguire ("Wise Up")
- 1998 – Sliding Doors ("Amateur")
- 1999 – Cruel Intentions ("You Could Make a Killing")
- 2002 – I Am Sam (“Two of Us”, with Michael Penn)
- 2003 – Buffy the Vampire Slayer: Radio Sunnydale - Music from the TV Series ("Pavlov's Bell")
- 2007 – Arctic Tale ("At the Edge of the World", with Zach Gill and "The Great Beyond")
- 2019 – Steven Universe the Movie (Original Soundtrack) (Vocals: "Independent Together", writing: "Drift Away")
- 2021 – M.O.D.O.K. (Original Soundtrack) ("Never Let You Go")

== Compilation appearances ==
- 1995 – "One", a Harry Nilsson cover for the For the Love of Harry: Everybody Sings Nilsson tribute album. Later appears on the Magnolia soundtrack and in the 2001 film, Just Can't Get Enough
- 1996 – "Christmastime" with Michael Penn, plays over the credits for the film, Hard Eight
- 1996 – "Christmastime" with Michael Penn, appears on the holiday compilation album Just Say Noël
- 1996 – "Baby Blue", a Badfinger cover, appears on the tribute compilation Come and Get It: A Tribute to Badfinger
- 1997 – "Nobody Does It Better", a cover of the Carly Simon theme for The Spy Who Loved Me on the compilation, Shaken and Stirred: The David Arnold James Bond Project
- 1999 – "The Christmas Song", a cover of the Mel Tormé/Robert Wells song popularized by Nat King Cole, appears on the holiday compilation Viva Noel: Q Division Christmas
- 2000 – "Reason to Believe" with Michael Penn, a Bruce Springsteen cover on the album Badlands: A Tribute to Bruce Springsteen's Nebraska
- 2001 – "I Just Wasn't Made for These Times" with Michael Penn, duet during A Tribute To Brian Wilson
- 2002 – "Two of Us" and "Lucy in the Sky with Diamonds", Beatles covers for the I Am Sam soundtrack. The former also includes Michael Penn, and the latter was only released on the European edition of the album.
- 2003 - “Save Me" appears on the live, studio compilation album KGSR Broadcasts – Volume 11
- 2004 – "What the World Needs Now", a Burt Bacharach cover. First appeared in a Calvin Klein commercial, and was later available on the Starbucks compilation album Sweetheart 2005: Love Songs
- 2005 – "Dear John" appears on the compilation album Acoustic 05 (The Echo Label)
- 2005 - “Going Through The Motions" appears on the live, studio compilation album KGSR Broadcasts – Volume 13
- 2007 – "Save Me" appears on the compilation album Acoustic 07 (V2 Records)
- 2007 – "White Christmas" appears on the Starbucks holiday compilation album Stockings By the Fire
- 2008 – "Freeway" appears on the live, studio compilation album KGSR Broadcasts – Volume 16
- 2012 - “Little Bombs" appears on the live, studio compilation album KGSR Broadcasts – Volume 20
- 2014 – "I'm Cured" for the charity comedy album 2776
- 2019 – "Hold On", a Tom Waits cover on the album Come On Up to the House: Women Sing Waits

== Videography ==
- 1993 – "Stupid Thing"
- 1993 – "I Should've Known" (dir. Katherine Dieckmann)
- 1993 – "Say Anything"
- 1995 – "That's Just What You Are" (dir. David Hogan)
- 1995 – "Amateur" (dir. Bobby Woods)
- 1999 – "Save Me" (dir. Paul Thomas Anderson)
- 2000 – "Ghost World" (dir. Michael Panes)
- 2000 – "Calling It Quits" (dir. Robert Cohen)
- 2001 – "Red Vines" (dir. Evan Mather)
- 2002 – "Pavlov's Bell" (dir. James Frost)
- 2002 – "How Am I Different" (dir. Naoki Mitsuse)
- 2003 – "Pavlov's Bell" (dir. Evan Mather, spec video)
- 2005 – "Video" (dir. James Frost, spec video)
- 2008 – "Freeway" (dir. Michael Blieden)
- 2008 – "31 Today" (dir. Bobcat Goldthwait)
- 2012 – "Charmer" (dir. Tom Scharpling)
- 2012 – "Labrador" (dir. Tom Scharpling)
- 2012 – "Soon Enough" (dir. Ben Berman)
- 2014 – "Milwaukee" (with The Both) (dir. Daniel Ralston)
- 2017 – "Patient Zero" (dir. Daniel Ralston)
- 2017 – "Goose Snow Cone" (dir. Rob Hatch-Miller & Puloma Basu)
- 2021 - "Suicide Is Murder" (dir. Puloma Basu & Rob Hatch-Miller)
