= Coming Up Close: A Retrospective =

Compilation album by 'Til Tuesday
- Released: September 24, 1996
- Recorded: 1985–1988
- Genre: Rock
- Length: 67:08
- Label: Epic
- Producers: Rhett Davies; Bruce Lampcov; Mike Thorne 'Til Tuesday

'Til Tuesday chronology
Everything's Different Now (1988)	Coming Up Close: A Retrospective (1996)

Professional ratings
Review scores
Source	Rating
Allmusic	link

Coming Up Close: A Retrospective is a compilation culled from the works of 'Til Tuesday. It was released on September 24, 1996 (see 1996 in music).

The compilation includes material from all three of 'Til Tuesday's studio albums to date, along with the previously unreleased track, "Do It Again".

== Track listing ==
1. "Love in a Vacuum" (Michael Hausman, Robert Holmes, Aimee Mann, Joey Pesce) – 3:37
2. "Voices Carry" (Hausman, Holmes, Mann, Pesce) – 4:23
3. "You Know the Rest" (Hausman, Holmes, Mann, Pesce) – 4:29
4. "No One Is Watching You Now" (Aimee Mann) – 3:56
5. "On Sunday" (Hausman, Holmes, Mann, Pesce) – 4:08
6. "Coming Up Close" (Mann) – 4:42
7. "Will She Just Fall Down" (Mann) – 2:52
8. "David Denies" (Hausman, Holmes, Mann, Pesce) – 4:51
9. "What About Love" (Mann) – 3:58
10. "Why Must I" (Mann) – 3:38
11. "The Other End (Of the Telescope)" (Declan MacManus, Mann) – 3:52
12. "J for Jules" (Mann) – 4:26
13. "(Believed You Were) Lucky" (Mann, Jules Shear) – 3:38
14. "Limits to Love" (Mann) – 3:35
15. "Long Gone Buddy" (Hausman, Mann) – 4:32
16. "Do It Again" – 3:57

== Personnel ==
'Til Tuesday
- Aimee Mann – Guitar (acoustic), Bass guitar, Vocals
- Michael Hausman – Percussion, Drums, Programming
- Robert Holmes – Guitar, Background Vocals
- Joey Pesce – Synthesizer, Piano, Background Vocals
- Michael Montes – Keyboards

- Peter Abrams – French horn
- Elvis Costello – Background Vocals on track 11
- Marcus Miller – Bass on track 15
- Haery Ung Shin – Violin

== Production ==
- Bob Clearmountain – Mixing
- Rhett Davies – Producer
- Bruce Dickinson – Compilation Producer
- Hiro Ito – Photography
- Bruce Lampcov – Producer
- Gail Marowitz – Art Direction and Design
- Randee Saint Nicholas – Photography
- Mike Thorne – Producer
- 'Til Tuesday – Producer
- Mark Wilder – Digital Mixing
