= (Believed You Were) Lucky =

Single by 'Til Tuesday

from the album Everything's Different Now
- B-side: "Limits to Love"
- Released: 1988
- Length: 3:37
- Label: Epic
- Songwriter(s): Aimee Mann; Jules Shear
- Producer(s): Rhett Davies

'Til Tuesday singles chronology
"Coming Up Close" (1986)	"(Believed You Were) Lucky" (1988)	"Rip in Heaven" (1988)

"(Believed You Were) Lucky" is a song by American band 'Til Tuesday, released in 1988 as the lead single from their third and final studio album, Everything's Different Now. The song was written by Aimee Mann (music, lyrics) and Jules Shear (music), and produced by Rhett Davies. "(Believed You Were) Lucky" peaked at No. 95 on the US Billboard Hot 100.

The single version of the song, which is also used on the video, is different to the album version, replacing the final profane chorus with a non-profane version.

== Background ==
"(Believed You Were) Lucky" was one of a number of songs on Everything's Different Now which was inspired by Mann and Shear's failed relationship. Mann told Steve Morse of The Boston Globe in 1988, "It was a really amazing relationship. I thought it was very healthy to stay together, but Jules just couldn't make up his mind."

== Music video ==
The song's music video was directed by Peter Wallach and produced by Michael Faerman and Wallach. In a 2018 interview with Stereogum, Mann criticized the video for being "super dumb". She added, "It was supposed to look like the Twilight Zone opening. I think that was the concept."

== Critical reception ==
On its release, Billboard described the song as a "spirited pop number" which is "delivered with conviction" and "shouldn't be overlooked". Cash Box listed the single as one of their "feature picks" during October 1988. They felt the song "fits into the quasi-sixties bag" and noted the "tight vocal harmonies".

During February 1989, Music & Media selected the song as their "Single of the Week" and wrote, "This is well produced, atmospheric folk/rock complete with attractive, intriguing melodies supported by a semi-acoustic sound." They also noted Mann's "fanciful vocals" as being "one of the most attractive things about this band". David Cavanagh of Sounds described it as "piping, tuneful stuff, but necessarily wistful" and "a twist on the dreaded Dear John scenario" as Mann "curtail[s] all amorous proceedings because her man lacks self-belief".

In a retrospective review of Everything's Different Now, Alex Henderson of AllMusic picked the song as one of the album's "introspective and personal gems" which shows Mann "coming from the heart".

== Track listing ==
7" and cassette single

1. "(Believed You Were) Lucky" - 3:37
2. "Limits to Love" - 3:35

7" single (US promo)

1. "(Believed You Were) Lucky" - 3:37
2. "(Believed You Were) Lucky" - 3:37

12" and CD single (UK release)

1. "(Believed You Were) Lucky" - 3:37
2. "Limits to Love" - 3:35
3. "Voices Carry" - 4:22
4. "What About Love" - 4:01

CD single (US promo)

1. "(Believed You Were) Lucky" - 3:37

== Personnel ==
'Til Tuesday

- Aimee Mann – vocals, bass, acoustic guitar, arranger
- Robert Holmes – guitar
- Michael Montes – keyboards
- Michael Hausman – drums, percussion, programming, arranger

Production

- Rhett Davies – producer (all tracks except "Voices Carry")
- Mike Thorne – producer of "Voices Carry"
- Bob Clearmountain – mixing on "Voices Carry"

== Charts ==
Chart (1988–1989)	Peak position
US Billboard Hot 100	95
US Adult Contemporary (Billboard)	32
US Alternative Airplay (Billboard)	30
