= Ultimate Collection (Aimee Mann album) =

Greatest hits album by Aimee Mann
- Released: September 12, 2000
- Genre: Alternative rock
- Length: 75:31
- Label: Hip-O
- Producers: John Boylan; Jon Brion; Rhett Davies; Mike Denneen; Mark Goldenberg; Michael Penn; Rhonda Shields; Dana Smart; Mike Thorne

Aimee Mann chronology
| Bachelor No. 2 (2000) | Ultimate Collection (2000) | Lost in Space (2002) |

Professional ratings
Review scores
| Source | Rating |
|---|---|
| AllMusic | 3/5 stars |
| PopMatters | (favorable) |
| The Rolling Stone Album Guide | 3/5 stars |

Ultimate Collection is a compilation album by the American singer-songwriter Aimee Mann, released on September 12, 2000, by Hip-O. It mostly comprises tracks from Mann's first two solo albums, Whatever (1993) and I'm with Stupid (1995), and her work with the band 'Til Tuesday.

== Lawsuit ==
Mann did not approve the release of Ultimate Collection. In a statement on her website, she said that the record company, Universal Music, had refused her offer to choose tracks and provide artwork. Instead, the compilation includes songs Mann considered substandard, such as a rough mix, a live radio performance, and a song recorded for the 1987 film Back to the Beach as a favor for a producer friend. It excludes most of her later work, such as her 1999 Academy Award-nominated song "Save Me".

In 2001, Mann sued Universal Music, saying the release breached an stipulation in her contract that Universal could not release a compilation without her consent. She also said the packaging and liner notes falsely suggested Mann had endorsed the compilation. She sought more than $2 million in damages.

== Track listing ==
All tracks written by Aimee Mann unless otherwise noted.

| No. | Title | Writer(s) | Original release | Length |
|---|---|---|---|---|
| 1. | "That's Just What You Are" | Jon Brion, Mann | Melrose Place (1994) | 4:32 |
| 2. | "You Could Make a Killing" | | I'm with Stupid (1993) | 3:43 |
| 3. | "You're with Stupid Now" | | I'm with Stupid (1993) | 3:27 |
| 4. | "Wise Up" | | Jerry Maguire soundtrack (1996) | 3:27 |
| 5. | "Driving with One Hand on the Wheel" | | "Long Shot" single (1995) | 2:44 |
| 6. | "Long Shot" | | I'm with Stupid (1995) | 3:09 |
| 7. | "Choice in the Matter" | Brion, Mann | I'm with Stupid (1995) | 3:12 |
| 8. | "Voices Carry" (Single Mix) | 'Til Tuesday | "Voices Carry" single (1985) | 4:21 |
| 9. | "Take It Back" | Brion, Mann | "I Should've Known" (1993) | 2:52 |
| 10. | "Say Anything" | Brion, Mann | Whatever (1993) | 4:57 |
| 11. | "Jacob Marley's Chain" | | Whatever (1993) | 3:01 |
| 12. | "Amateur" | Brion, Mann | I'm with Stupid (1995) | 4:43 |
| 13. | "All Over Now" | | I'm with Stupid (1995) | 3:38 |
| 14. | "Baby Blue" | Pete Ham | "I Should've Known" single (1993) | 3:51 |
| 15. | "Everything's Different Now" | Jules Shear, Matthew Sweet | "Everything's Different Now" (1988) | 3:57 |
| 16. | "Sign of Love" | Jennifer Condos, Mark Goldenberg | Back to the Beach soundtrack (1987) | 3:50 |
| 17. | "The Other End (of the Telescope)" (Live Version) | Elvis Costello, Mann | "Stupid Thing" single (1993) | 4:27 |
| 18. | "Jimmy Hoffa Jokes" | | "Say Anything" single (1993) | 2:30 |
| 19. | "Stupid Thing" | Brion, Mann | Whatever (1993) | 4:27 |
| 20. | "I Should've Known" | | Whatever (1993) | 4:53 |
| Total length: | | | | 75:41 |
