= Bachelor No. 2 or, the Last Remains of the Dodo =

Studio album by Aimee Mann
- Released: May 2, 2000
- Recorded: 1999
- Genre: Pop rock
- Length: 49:21
- Labels: SuperEgo, V2
- Producers: Jon Brion; Mike Denneen; Buddy Judge; Aimee Mann; Brendan O'Brien

Aimee Mann chronology
Magnolia (1999)	Bachelor No. 2 or, the Last Remains of the Dodo (2000)	Ultimate Collection (2000)

Singles from Bachelor No. 2 or, the Last Remains of the Dodo
- 1. "Red Vines" Released: March 12, 2001; 2. "Calling It Quits" Released: September 17, 2001

Bachelor No. 2 or, the Last Remains of the Dodo is the third studio album by the American singer-songwriter Aimee Mann, released on May 2, 2000. Some songs were previously released on the soundtrack for the 1999 film Magnolia, which Mann wrote in the same period. She co-wrote "The Fall of the World's Own Optimist" with Elvis Costello.

Mann took more control over the production than on her previous albums. Many of the songs were inspired by her frustration with her record label, Geffen Records. Mann's previous albums had not been successful, and Geffen refused to release Bachelor No. 2, feeling it contained no hit singles. In response, Mann set up her own label, SuperEgo, and released it herself. Bachelor No. 2 sold 270,000 copies, a large number for an independent artist.

According to Metacritic, Bachelor No. 2 is the 28th best-reviewed album and the ninth best-reviewed indie or alternative album of the decade, and Slant Magazine named it the decade's 100th-best album. The success established Mann as a career artist who could work outside of the major label system.

== Writing ==
Aimee Mann's first two solo albums, Whatever (1993) and I'm With Stupid (1995), achieved strong reviews but did not meet sales expectations. After success in the 1980s with her band 'Til Tuesday, Mann began to be seen as someone whose career was in decline. Later in the 1990s, Mann became a regular act at Largo, a Los Angeles nightclub where her collaborator Jon Brion hosted performances from alternative songwriters including Elliott Smith, Fiona Apple and Rufus Wainwright. This shaped Mann's songwriting; Largo fit her so well that the owner jokingly nicknamed it "Aimee Mann's clubhouse".

Mann contributed songs to the soundtrack of the 1999 film Magnolia, including four songs later included on Bachelor No. 2. She wrote the soundtrack and Bachelor No. 2 in the same period, and collaborated with Brion. For Bachelor. No 2, Mann took more control over the production than she had for her previous albums, and said in 2020: "This was the only record that I really took responsibility for all the music: all the parts that were played, the way everything sounded." The dodo of the album title reflected Mann's sense that singer-songwriters were a "dying breed" in 2000.

Mann's frustration with her record label, Geffen, inspired many of the songs. She described playing them to Geffen staff, who would complain that they did not sound like commercial singles. The criticism made her feel that she was failing and she developed writer's block. One executive suggested she work with Diane Warren, who had written hit singles for major acts. Mann wrote "Nothing Is Good Enough" in response to the criticism, but felt the song could also apply to many kinds of relationship.

"The Fall of the World's Own Optimist" was co-written with the English singer-songwriter Elvis Costello. According to Mann, "I sent him a tape of a song that I couldn't finish and he added a new bit. Basically I had a problem with a song and he fixed it — it was as simple as that." Mann and Costello had previously collaborated on "The Other End (of the Telescope)", released on the 1988 'Til Tuesday album Everything's Different Now.

== Release ==
Geffen refused to release Bachelor No. 2, feeling it had no commercial potential. According to Mann, the Geffen boss, Jimmy Iovine, said: "Aimee doesn't expect us to put this record out as it is, does she?" Mann said Bachelor No. 2 could have been released in 1998, but it was delayed by disputes with Geffen and the marketing for Magnolia. In response, Mann sold homemade EPs of her music on tour, a move she described as a "DIY fuck-you-record-company-I'm-selling-it-myself" gesture.

In 1998, the Sony Music employee Gail Marowitz predicted that Mann would make more money selling 70,000 albums independently than by selling 300,000 on a major label. In 1999, Mann and her manager, Michael Hausman, formed their own label, SuperEgo Records. With Mann's husband, the songwriter Michael Penn, they also established United Musicians, a collective working outside the major label system. Using the money earned through royalties from Magnolia, Mann bought the Bachelor No. 2 masters from Geffen. She said later: "I could not have gotten out of there fast enough."

Boosted by attention from Magnolia, Mann sold 25,000 copies of Bachelor No. 2 via mail order from her website, a large amount for an independent artist. After she secured a distribution deal, Bachelor No. 2 sold more than 270,000 copies, outperforming I'm With Stupid. Pitchfork described this as a "decisive victory". The success established Mann as a career artist who could work outside of the major label system. As of May 2008, Bachelor No. 2 had sold more than 230,000 copies in the US. In 2020, Mann released a 20th-anniversary reissue for Record Store Day, with an alternative track list and five bonus tracks, including songs included on the Magnolia soundtrack. Mann said she remained pleased with the album and did not regret leaving Geffen.

== Reception ==
Professional ratings
Aggregate scores
Source	Rating
Metacritic	89/100
Review scores
Source	Rating
AllMusic	4.5/5 stars
The Baltimore Sun	3/4 stars
Entertainment Weekly	A−
Los Angeles Times	3.5/4 stars
Pitchfork	9.0/10
Q	4/5 stars
Rolling Stone	4/5 stars
The Rolling Stone Album Guide	4/5 stars
The Times	4/5 stars
USA Today	3.5/4 stars

On the review aggregator website Metacritic, Bachelor No. 2 has a score of 89 out of 100 based on 13 reviews, indicating "universal acclaim". According to Metacritic, it is the 28th-best-reviewed album and the ninth-best-reviewed indie or alternative album of the decade.

Writing for the New Yorker in 2000, Nick Hornby wrote that Bachelor No. 2 was Mann's strongest work to date, praising her "bleak and bracing cynicism about our ability to connect with fellow humans" and her "sinuous, Burt Bacharach-like melodies". Slant Magazine named the album the 100th-best of the decade.

Reviewing the album in 2019, Pitchfork called it a "contemporary classic" with "the organic flow of a late-night set in a small, hushed room ... Though they're by no means minimalistic, these arrangements establish a sense of intimacy that's hard to find on full-band rock records that aren't deliberately, performatively lo-fi."

== Track listing ==
No.	Title	Writer(s)	Producer(s)	Length
1.	"How Am I Different"	Aimee Mann; Jon Brion	Aimee Mann	5:03
2.	"Nothing Is Good Enough"	Mann	Mann; Buddy Judge	3:10
3.	"Red Vines"	Mann	Mann	3:44
4.	"The Fall of the World's Own Optimist"	Mann; Elvis Costello	Jon Brion	3:06
5.	"Satellite"	Mann	Mann	4:10
6.	"Deathly"	Mann	Brion	5:37
7.	"Ghost World"	Mann	Mike Dineen	3:30
8.	"Calling It Quits"	Mann	Judge	4:09
9.	"Driving Sideways"	Mann; Michael Lockwood	Brendan O'Brien	3:49
10.	"Just Like Anyone"	Mann	Mann	1:22
11.	"Susan"	Mann	Mann	3:51
12.	"It Takes All Kinds"	Mann	Mann	4:06
13.	"You Do"	Mann; Brion	Mann	3:43
Total length:				49:21

== Personnel ==
=== Musicians ===
- Aimee Mann – vocals (1–13), backing vocals (1–4,7—9,11), bass (1—8,10—13), acoustic guitar (1,3,6,8,10—13), Nashville guitar (1), guitar (7), tambourine (7,11), hi-hat (11)
- Jon Brion – electric guitar (4,6), keyboards (4), backing vocals (6), drums (6)
- Mark Flannagan – trumpet (8)
- Juliana Hatfield – backing vocals (6)
- Michael Hausman – tambourine (3), drum programming (13)
- Buddy Judge – backing vocals (1–5,7,8,12,13), drum programming (1,3,8), Wurlitzer (8), drum loops (8)
- Hank Linderman – drum programming (11)
- Michael Lockwood – electric guitar (1,3,4,7–9,12,13), guitar (5,6,11), percussion (5), backing vocals (9), 12-string acoustic guitar (9), Cheesy Keyboards (13)
- Dan MacCarroll – drums (3,9,11)
- Ric Menck – drums (2,8)
- Brendan O'Brien – bass (9), slide guitar (9)
- Michael Panes – violin (10)
- Michael Penn – backing vocals (1,5,9,11), slide guitar (3), feedback guitar (5), electric guitar (9), guitar (13)
- Grant Lee Phillips – backing vocals (1,5)
- John Sands – drums (1,4,5,7,12)
- Clayton Scoble – electric guitar (4)
- Benmont Tench – Chamberlin (3), piano (8)
- Jennifer Trynin – electric guitar (7)
- Patrick Warren – keyboards (1,5,7,11,12), piano (3,9), Chamberlin (3,8,10,13), guitar (6), accordion (10), celeste (13)

=== Production ===
- Producers: Aimee Mann, Jon Brion, Mike Denneen, Buddy Judge, Brendan O'Brien
- Executive producer: Michael Hausman
- Engineers: Mike Denneen, Nick DiDia, Ryan Freeland, S. "Husky" Höskulds, Dustin Jones, Buddy Judge, Hank Linderman, Brian Scheuble
- Assistant engineers: Elijah Bradford, Carlos Castro, Connie Hill, Dustin Jones
- Mixing: David Boucher, Bob Clearmountain, Ryan Freeland
- Mastering: Shawn R. Britton
- Extensive Help with Production: Buddy Judge
- Assistants: David Boucher, Ryan Freeland
- Computers: Buddy Judge
- Drum engineering: Hank Linderman
- Vocal engineer: S. "Husky" Hoskulds
- Art direction: Aimee Mann, Gail Marowitz
- Design: Aimee Mann, Gail Marowitz
