= That's Just What You Are =

1994 song by Aimee Mann

Single by Aimee Mann

from the album I'm with Stupid
- B-side: "I Should've Known"
- Released: 1994
- Genre: Rock
- Length: 4:24; 3:47 (video edit)
- Label: Imago; Geffen
- Songwriters: Aimee Mann; Jon Brion
- Producer: Mike Denneen

Aimee Mann singles chronology
"Say Anything" (1994)	"That's Just What You Are" (1994)	"Choice in the Matter" (1995)

"That's Just What You Are" is a song by American singer-songwriter Aimee Mann, which was released in 1994 as a single from the soundtrack of Melrose Place. It was also included on Mann's second studio album I'm with Stupid (1995). The song was written by Mann and Jon Brion, and produced by Mike Denneen.

"That's Just What You Are" reached No. 93 on the Billboard Hot 100 and No. 24 on the Billboard Modern Rock Tracks charts. The song's music video was directed by David Hogan.

== Background ==
"That's Just What You Are" was written by Mann and Jon Brion. Speaking of the inspiration behind the song, Mann told Billboard in 1994, "We were talking about people who act like jerks but insist that they can't change because that would somehow erode the integrity of their personality. Like that excuse, 'That's just how I am, man. If I changed, I wouldn't be myself.' Which is this annoying, '60s bullshit way of basically saying 'I have no intention of doing any work.' We both had friends that were annoying us in that same exact way."

The song was recorded with Glenn Tilbrook and Chris Difford of Squeeze providing backing vocals (Tilbrook also plays electric guitar on the track). Mann revealed to the Hartford Courant in 1994, "It's incredibly thrilling to hear their voices on this song. It happened to be this song which really works with their singing style. It's got this Chris Difford low-octave thing – too low for me to sing. So using them was perfect, exactly what we needed." Mann collaborated with Squeeze after Difford heard her perform acoustically on radio. Difford sent a fax to the radio station, praising Mann's material and performance, and left a phone number for her to contact him. Shortly after the recording of "That's Just What You Are", Mann and Squeeze embarked on a ten-day joint acoustic tour during June and July 1994.

"That's Just What You Are" was originally intended to have been released as a UK-only single, but this did not come to fruition. Mann was then approached with the request of providing a track for the soundtrack of the American prime time television soap opera Melrose Place. Mann had never watched the show, but agreed to have "That's Just What You Are" used. She told the Los Angeles Times in 1994, "I asked who else was on [the soundtrack] and they said Paul Westerberg, so I said, 'great'. Then I asked friends if they watched the show, and people who said they did were pretty cool, so that was my research."

The song was released as a single by Mann's label Imago, which ran into financial difficulties at the end of 1994. The label folded and Mann would sign with Geffen for the release of her second album, I'm with Stupid, in 1995, which included "That's Just What You Are". The single was not released commercially in the United Kingdom but was used by BBC Sport as the Goal of the Tournament background music during the Euro 96 football championships.

== Critical reception ==
In a review of the Melrose Place soundtrack, Faith Quintavell of The Philadelphia Inquirer picked "That's Just What You Are" as the best track and described it as a "graceful indictment of a lover who chooses to live the unexamined life". Sam Gnerre of the News-Pilot felt the song "continues the level of excellence established by Mann's Whatever album". He added, "Her low-key vocal, the inventive arrangement, and a memorable melody make the CD almost worth getting for this track alone."

Mark Deming of AllMusic praised the "hum-along pop" tune. He considered the lyrics to be "sly and witty" and felt the music was a "perfect match" as it "also wears its smarts on its sleeve" and "has a dark undertow in those minor-key piano breaks". In a 2018 retrospective on the song, Jim Beviglia of American Songwriter described it as "melodically springing and lyrically stinging". He considered it an example of Mann's ability to "marry impossibly catchy tunes to words that simmered with disappointment and dismay".

== Track listing ==
=== Imago Records (1994) ===
CD and cassette single (US release)

1. "That's Just What You Are" – 4:24
2. "I Should've Known" (Edit) – 4:52

CD single (US promo)

1. "That's Just What You Are" (Radio Edit) – 4:18
2. "That's Just What You Are" (Acoustic Mix) – 4:19
3. "That's Just What You Are" (Original Version) – 4:20

CD single (European and Australian release)

1. "That's Just What You Are" – 4:25
2. "Superball" – 2:46
3. "Momentum" – 3:29
4. "Stupid Thing" (Alternate Version) – 4:10
5. "Untitled" (Hidden track) – 0:29
6. "Jimmy Hoffa Jokes" (Hidden Track) – 2:33

=== Geffen Records (1995) ===
CD single (European promo)

1. "That's Just What You Are" – 4:22
2. "Long Shot" – 3:13

CD single (Australian release)

1. "That's Just What You Are" (LP Version) – 4:22
2. "That's Just What You Are" (Acoustic Mix) – 4:19
3. "Ray" (LP Version) – 4:48

== Personnel ==
That's Just What You Are

- Aimee Mann – lead vocals, backing vocals, acoustic guitar, electric guitar, bass
- Glenn Tilbrook – electric guitar, backing vocals
- Chris Difford – backing vocals
- Clayton Scoble – electric guitar
- Mike Denneen – piano, organ
- Martyn Watson – drum programming

Production

- Mike Denneen – producer, recording and mixing on "That's Just What You Are"
- Jon Brion – producer of "I Should've Known", "Superball", "Momentum", "Stupid Thing" and "Ray"
- Luke Gifford – assistant mixer on "That's Just What You Are"

== Charts ==
Chart (1994–95)	Peak position
US Billboard Hot 100	93
US Alternative Airplay (Billboard)	24
