= Looking Over My Shoulder =

'Til Tuesday song

Single by 'Til Tuesday

from the album Voices Carry
- B-side: "Don't Watch Me Bleed"
- Released: August 6, 1985
- Genre: New wave
- Length: 3:50 (single version); 4:15 (album version)
- Label: Epic
- Songwriter(s): Aimee Mann; Michael Hausman; Robert Holmes; Joey Pesce
- Producer(s): Mike Thorne

'Til Tuesday singles chronology
"Voices Carry" (1985)	"Looking Over My Shoulder" (1985)	"Love in a Vacuum" (1985)

"Looking Over My Shoulder" is a song by American band 'Til Tuesday, which was released in 1985 as the second single from their debut studio album Voices Carry. The song was written by Aimee Mann, Michael Hausman, Robert Holmes and Joey Pesce, and produced by Mike Thorne. "Looking Over My Shoulder" peaked at No. 61 on the US Billboard Hot 100.

== Music video ==
The song's music video was directed by Nick Haggerty and produced by Paul Schiff for N. Lee Lacy & Associates. It was shot in July 1985 in the Manhattan borough of New York City, including at the Convent of the Sacred Heart. The video received active rotation on MTV.

== Critical reception ==
On its release as a single, Billboard described "Looking Over My Shoulder" as a "broad, sweeping tune" and praised Mann for "the best Bowie soundalike vocal yet achieved by a woman". Cash Box considered the song a "certain pop hit". They commented, "The moody verses give way to an infectious, effective chorus. Mann's vocal is strong and similar in intensity to her previous outing." In a retrospective review of Voices Carry, Joe Viglione of AllMusic noted the song's "bubbling intensity which Holmes' guitar adds drama to".

== Track listing ==
7" single

1. "Looking Over My Shoulder" (Single Mix) – 3:50
2. "Don't Watch Me Bleed" – 3:26

7" single (US promo)

1. "Looking Over My Shoulder" (Single Mix) – 3:50
2. "Looking Over My Shoulder" (Single Mix) – 3:50

12" (US promo)

1. "Looking Over My Shoulder" (Single Mix) – 3:50
2. "Looking Over My Shoulder" (Long Version) – 4:06

== Personnel ==
'Til Tuesday

- Aimee Mann – vocals, bass
- Robert Holmes – guitar, backing vocals
- Joey Pesce – synthesizer, backing vocals
- Michael Hausman – drums, percussion

Production

- Mike Thorne – producer
- Bob Clearmountain – mixing on "Looking Over My Shoulder" (Single Mix)
- Domenic Maita – engineer
- Mike Krowiak, Jeff Lippay – studio assistants
- Harvey Goldberg – mixing engineer
- Moira Marquis – mixing assistant
- Jack Skinner – mastering

Other

- Britain Hill – photography
- Hiro Ito – photography (Japanese sleeve)

== Charts ==
Chart performance for "Looking Over My Shoulder"
Chart (1985)	Peak
US Billboard Hot 100	61
US Cash Box Top 100 Pop Singles	62
