= Michael Lockwood (guitarist) =

American guitarist and producer (born 1961)

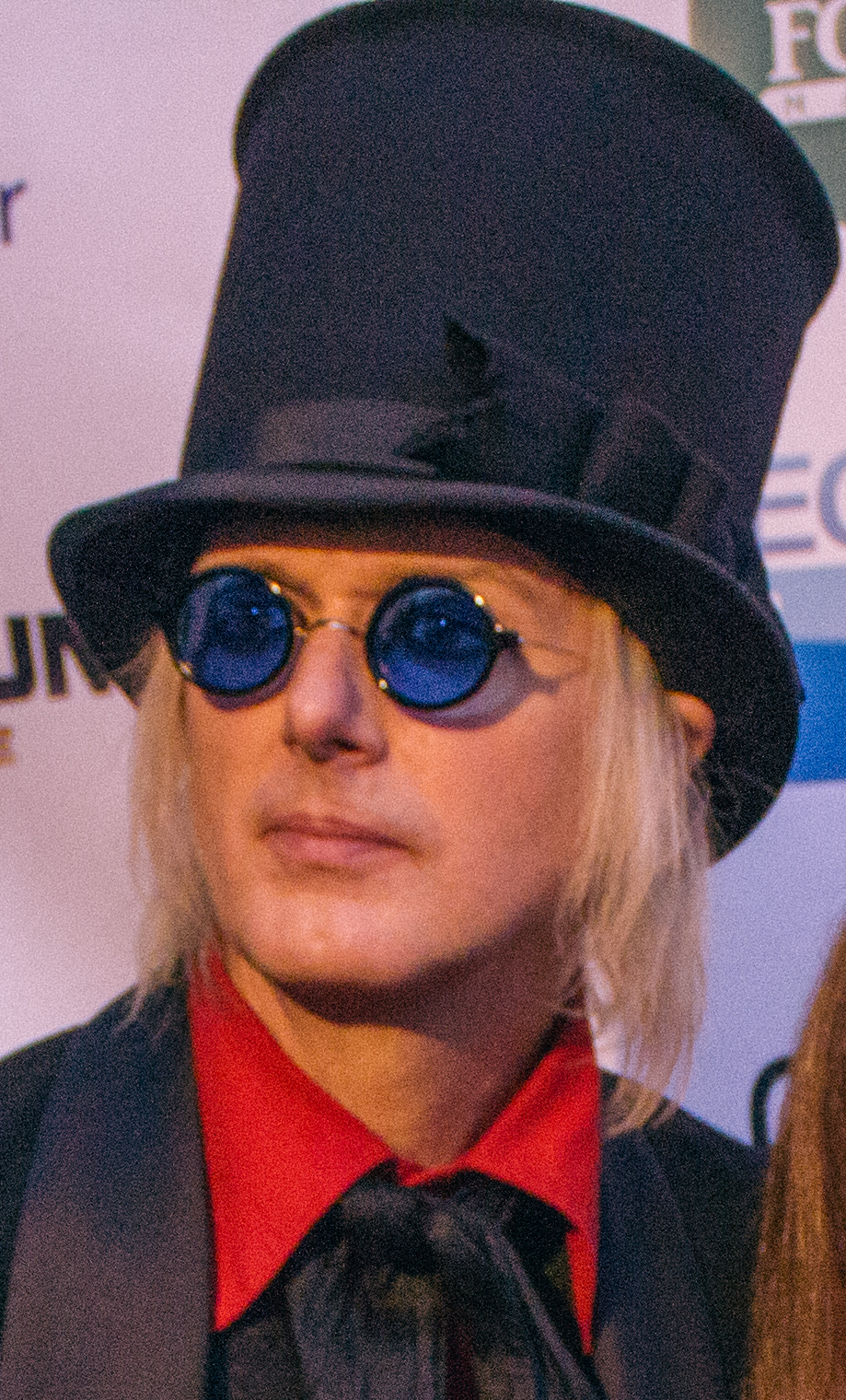
- Lockwood in 2014
- Born: Michael Dean Lockwood; May 22, 1961 (age 64); Hawthorne, California, U.S.
- Occupations: Musician; producer
- Years active: 1985–present
- Spouses: Lisa Marie Presley (m. 2006; div. 2021) Stephanie Hobgood (m. 2022)
- Children: 2
- Musical career
- Origin: Los Angeles, California, U.S.
- Genres: New wave; hard rock; experimental rock; pop rock
- Instrument: Guitar
- Member of: Carly Simon; Fiona Apple; Bijou Phillips
- Website: michaellockwood.com

Michael Dean Lockwood (born May 22, 1961) is an American guitarist and producer. He is best known for having been married to Lisa Marie Presley, and for producing and performing with her, Aimee Mann, Fiona Apple, and others.

== Biography ==
Lockwood graduated from Highland High School in Bakersfield, California, in 1979. He has worked with Carly Simon, Fiona Apple, Bijou Phillips, Alana Davis, Ben Taylor, Leona Naess, Susanna Hoffs and Michael Penn. In 1985, Lockwood joined the group Lions & Ghosts. They disbanded in 1989 after a second record was released. He later formed a local power pop band, Wink.

== Personal life ==
Lockwood married Lisa Marie Presley on January 22, 2006. On October 7, 2008, Presley gave birth to twin girls. In June 2016, Presley filed for divorce from Lockwood after ten years of marriage.

In February 2017, the couple's children were taken into protective custody after Presley stated that she witnessed inappropriate images of children on Lockwood's personal computer in a divorce court filing challenging Lockwood's request for spousal support. Her court filing stated 80 of Lockwood's electronic devices were retrieved to be searched by law enforcement, and West Hollywood Police confirmed a search warrant had been executed related to the family. The Tennessee Bureau of Investigation also mounted an informal investigation but later announced it had found no evidence of a crime occurring in the state. The divorce was finalized on May 26, 2021.

Lockwood married Stephanie Hobgood on October 10, 2022. Hobgood is a Phoenix-born hairstylist whose clients include Kendall and Kylie Jenner.

== Selected discography ==
Throughout his career Lockwood has worked with a wide range of artists and bands in various genres both as a musician and collaborator.

| Year | CD Title | Artist | Credits |
|---|---|---|---|
| 2012 | Storm & Grace | Lisa Marie Presley | Guitar |
| 2008 | This Kind of Love | Carly Simon | Guitar, Soloist |
| 2007 | Brittany Shane | Brittany Shane | Bass, Guitar, Guitar (Electric), Omnichord |
| 2006 | Lucky Girl | Kirsten Proffit | Guitar (Electric) |
| 2006 | Movie Disaster Music | Josie Cotton | Guitar |
| 2006 | Now What | Lisa Marie Presley | Composer, Executive Producer, Guitars, Programmer |
| 2004 | I Heart Huckabees | Jon Brion | Guitar |
| 2004 | New York's A Go Go | Sylvain Sylvain | Guitar |
| 2004 | Pianoforte | Phil Parlapiano | Guitar (Electric) |
| 2004 | Soundlight | Keith Chagall | Guitar (Electric), Soloist |
| 2002 | Acoustic, Vol. 2 | Various artists | Producer |
| 2002 | Anthology | Carly Simon | Guitar (Acoustic), Guitar (Electric) |
| 2002 | Bleeding Together | Dissent | Associate Producer, Cover Art |
| 2002 | I Am Sam | I Am Sam | Producer, Guitars, Bass, Keyboards |
| 2002 | Lost in Space | Aimee Mann | Producer, Engineer, Editor, Guitars, Synthesizers |
| 2002 | Respond, Vol. 2 | Various Artists | Guitar (Electric), Keyboards, Producer |
| 2002 | Songs Inspired by Literature: Chapter One | The Sibl Project | Primary Artist |
| 2001 | Detours into Unconscious Rhythms | Calvin Keys | Photography |
| 2000 | Bachelor No. 2 or, the Last Remains of the Dodo | Aimee Mann | Composer, Guitars, Keyboards, Melodica, Background Vocals |
| 2000 | The Bedroom Tapes | Carly Simon | Guitar (Acoustic) |
| 2000 | Ultimate Collection | Aimee Mann | Guitar |
| 2000 | I'd Rather Eat Glass | Bijou Phillips | Guitar |
| 1999 | Magnolia | Film Score | Composer |
| 1999 | Rubies on the Lawn | Trish Murphy | Guitar |
| 1998 | (Sleep) Baby Doll | Sylvain Sylvain | Guitar |
| 1997 | Brand New | Salt-N-Pepa | Guitar |
| 1995 | Automatic 7 | Automatic 7 | Photography |
| 1995 | I'm with Stupid | Aimee Mann | Guitar |
| 1994 | "Save Me" | Aimee Mann | Guitar (Acoustic), Guitar (Electric), Background Vocals |
| 1989 | Wild Garden | Lions & Ghosts | Guitar, Background Vocals |
| 1987 | Velvet Kiss, Lick of the Lime | Lions & Ghosts | Guitar, Vocals |
