= Voices Carry (disambiguation) =

"Voices Carry" is a 1985 song by American new wave band 'Til Tuesday

Voices Carry may also refer to:

In music:

- Voices Carry (album), the 1985 'Til Tuesday album containing the song of the same name
- "Voices Carrey" a 2022 song by Lights from Pep

In books:

- Voices Carry, novel by Mariah Stewart 2001
- Voices Carry, autobiography by playwright Ying Ruocheng 2009, China's Vice Minister of Culture from 1986 to 1990

In film and TV:

- "Voices Carry", a 1999 episode of Diagnosis: Murder
- "Voices Carry", a 2004 episode of Degrassi: The Next Generation
- "Voices Carry", a 2005 episode of The 4400
- "Voices Carry", a 2012 episode of Welcome to Sweetie Pie's
- "Voices Carry", a 2015 episode of Royal Pains
