= Voices Carry (album) =

Studio album by 'Til Tuesday
- Released: April 20, 1985
- Recorded: 1985
- Studios: R.P.M. Sound, New York, NY
- Genres: Rock, new wave
- Length: 41:52
- Label: Epic
- Producer: Mike Thorne

'Til Tuesday chronology
Voices Carry (1985)	Welcome Home (1986)

Singles from Voices Carry
- 1. "Voices Carry" Released: March 28, 1985; 2. "Looking Over My Shoulder" Released: August 6, 1985; 3. "Love in a Vacuum" Released: 1985

Voices Carry is the debut studio album by American new wave band 'Til Tuesday, released in 1985.

'Til Tuesday's debut single was the album's title track, which went to #8 on the Billboard singles chart and remains the band's best-known song. The "Voices Carry" video won the MTV Video Music Award for Best New Artist and was played heavily on MTV. The album's second and third singles were "Looking Over My Shoulder" (which peaked at No. 61 on the Billboard Hot 100) and "Love in a Vacuum".

== Production ==
Martin Rushent was considered for the role of producer for Voices Carry.

== Release ==
Voices Carry was released on April 20, 1985. The album entered the Billboard 200 at 152nd place on June 25. The album spent 31 weeks on the chart, peaking at 19.

== Reception ==
Professional ratings
Review scores
Source	Rating
AllMusic	3/5 stars
Robert Christgau	B−

Spin described the album as "a pleasure, but not a revelation" and that "almost all the tunes are instantly catchy, if not especially inspired." Spin praised the group's vocalist stating that "in lead singer Aimee Mann they may have a star. [...] she has her own look and a voice that's evocative, thought not yet distinctive enough to stake out its own turf in the crowded field of female vocalists." Robert Christgau gave the album a B− rating, stating that the group rolls out "synth-pop hooks like vintage A Flock of Seagulls, but Aimee Mann's throaty warble sounds almost human. And while the generalization level of her aggressively banal lyrics signals product, not expression, every one lands square on a recognizable romantic cliché."

In a retrospective review, AllMusic wrote, "While most bands from Boston suffered from lack of production, Mike Thorne does a decent job on much of the album and excellent work on the title track." The review found that "Love in a Vacuum" was "over-produced, creating a good album track when the true follow-up hit was actually in hand." The review went on to note haunting lyrics on "I Could Get Used to This" and "No More Crying" which "separate this recording from work of similar '80s bands". The review concluded that "this album and its follow-ups should have had as much commercial success as the Cars, because artistically, they are equal to that band's dynamic debut."

== Legacy ==
The popular Canadian teen drama Degrassi: The Next Generation, which is known for naming each episode after an ‘80s hit song or album, named a two-part episode after this album.

== Track listing ==
All lyrics are written by Aimee Mann; all music is composed by 'Til Tuesday.

No.	Title	Length
1.	"Love in a Vacuum"	3:34
2.	"Looking Over My Shoulder"	4:15
3.	"I Could Get Used to This"	3:02
4.	"No More Crying"	4:18
5.	"Voices Carry"	4:20
6.	"Winning the War"	4:03
7.	"You Know the Rest"	4:26
8.	"Maybe Monday"	3:40
9.	"Are You Serious?"	3:15
10.	"Don't Watch Me Bleed"	3:26
11.	"Sleep"	3:40

== Personnel ==
'Til Tuesday

- Aimee Mann – lead vocals, backing vocals, bass
- Robert Holmes – electric guitar, backing vocals
- Joey Pesce – synthesizers, piano, backing vocals
- Michael Hausman – drums, percussion

Production

- Produced By Mike Thorne
- Executive Producer: Dick Wingate
- Engineered By Dominick Maita
- Mixed By Harvey Goldberg; assisted by Moira Marquis
- Studio Assistants: Mike Krowiak & Jeff Lippay
- Mastered By Jack Skinner
- Britain Hill – photography

== Charts ==
Chart (1985)	Peak position
Australia (Kent Music Report)	81
United States (Billboard 200)	19

== Certifications ==
Region	Certification	Certified units/sales
Canada (Music Canada)	Gold	50,000^{^}
United States (RIAA)	Gold	500,000^{^}
^{^} Shipments figures based on certification alone.
