= What About Love ('Til Tuesday song) =

1986 song by 'Til Tuesday

Single by 'Til Tuesday

from the album Welcome Home
- B-side: "Will She Just Fall Down"
- Released: 1986
- Genre: Pop
- Length: 4:01
- Label: Epic
- Songwriter(s): Aimee Mann
- Producer(s): Rhett Davies

'Til Tuesday singles chronology
"Love in a Vacuum" (1985)	"What About Love" (1986)	"Coming Up Close" (1986)

Music video
- "What About Love" on YouTube

"What About Love" is a song by American band 'Til Tuesday, which was released in 1986 as the lead single from their second studio album Welcome Home. The song was written by Aimee Mann and produced by Rhett Davies. "What About Love" peaked at No. 26 on the US Billboard Hot 100.

== Background ==
'Til Tuesday wanted "Coming Up Close" to be the first single from Welcome Home, rather than "What About Love". Mann told The Atlanta Constitution in 1986, "I really love 'Coming Up Close' and we did want it to be the first single. But we sort of realized that 'What About Love' was more immediate." She described "What About Love" as a "radio song". The album and its two singles achieved modest commercial success in the United States but did not live up to the expectations of Epic Records or the band.

== Music video ==
The song's music video was directed and produced by Ken Ross and Richard Levine. It was filmed on an estate in Upstate New York. To achieve the desired effects, the video was shot using both a 35mm camera and a Super 8. The video achieved power rotation on MTV.

== Critical reception ==
On its release, Billboard described "What About Love" as an "easygoing dance tune" and a "pretty pop song that bites". They added that the song "gets its impact from Mann's sharp-focus lead".

Bill Novak of The Sheboygan Press rated the single two and a half out of four stars, describing it as "not a very imaginative single but the vocals are good and the musicians are adequate." Music & Media considered the song to be "a moody number with a good build-up that, considering the success of Berlin's 'Take My Breath Away', could do well in Europe."

In a review of Welcome Home, Sam Gnerre of the News-Pilot described "What About Love" as a "fine song" and a "dead ringer for the Pretenders, with Mann's smoky vocals and some sharp guitar work combining to sound remarkably like one of Chrissie Kerr's stately ballads". Duncan Strauss of the Los Angeles Times considered it to be "an engaging tune that brings all of the Boston quartet's strengths together". Cheryl Wenner of The Morning Call picked the song as a highlight and described it as "an engaging song about living on hope that features some fancy guitar work by Robert Holmes".

== Track listing ==
7–inch single

1. "What About Love" – 4:01
2. "Will She Just Fall Down" – 2:50

7–inch and 12–inch single (US promo)

1. "What About Love" – 4:01
2. "What About Love" – 4:01

12–inch single

1. "What About Love" (Long Version) – 6:30
2. "Voices Carry" – 4:13
3. "Will She Just Fall Down" – 2:50

12–inch single (UK release)

1. "What About Love" – 4:01
2. "Voices Carry" – 4:22
3. "Will She Just Fall Down" – 2:50

== Personnel ==
'Til Tuesday

- Aimee Mann – vocals, bass
- Robert Holmes – guitar, backing vocals
- Joey Pesce – synthesizer, backing vocals
- Michael Hausman – drums, percussion

Production

- Rhett Davies – producer of "What About Love" and "Will She Just Fall Down"
- Bruce Lampcov – engineering and mixing on "What About Love" and "Will She Just Fall Down"
- Mark McKenna – engineering on "What About Love" and "Will She Just Fall Down"
- Mike Thorne – producer of "Voices Carry"
- Bob Clearmountain – mixing on "Voices Carry"
- Bob Ludwig – mastering

== Charts ==
=== Weekly charts ===
Chart (1986)	Peak position
Australia (Kent Music Report)	92
Italy Airplay (Music & Media)	19
US Billboard Hot 100	26
US Mainstream Rock (Billboard)	9
US Cash Box Top 100 Pop Singles	28
