= Evan Mather =

American film director

Evan Mather (born 25 February 1970) is an American landscape architect, urban designer, and filmmaker. He is primarily known for his work in the genre of web film specifically the reconfiguration of personal histories and exploration of memory landscapes.

The most successful web-stream films, of course, are made with the format in mind. American film-maker Evan Mather's work, such as Icarus of Pittsburgh (2002), is a good example: densely packed with visual and aural information, his films seem made to be watched intently, in isolation and cocooned by headphones.

== Background ==
Mather was born in New Orleans and spent his childhood in Baton Rouge. He is a second-cousin of A Confederacy of Dunces author John Kennedy Toole. In 1993 he received a degree in landscape architecture from Louisiana State University. In 1995 he started the online video site Hand Crafted Films as a forum to experiment with the self-distribution of short films via the Internet. He gained early notoriety for his animated short films featuring Star Wars action figures. Most recently his films have focused on design and architectural issues, notably his 2009 documentary short film A Necessary Ruin about a geodesic dome ostensibly designed by Buckminster Fuller and its raison d'etre in Baton Rouge. A 2011 advocacy film, A Plea For Modernism, attempted to save a historic modernist elementary school in New Orleans. Mather's first feature film, From Sea To Shining Sea, was funded by Kickstarter and premiered at the National Building Museum in 2014. In 2017, Evan Mather was elevated to the ASLA Council of Fellows. In Fall 2021, his documentary essay film Sanctum was awarded a Professional Communications Award of Honor from the ASLA.

== Filmography ==
Year	English title	Genre	Notes
1998	Quentin Tarantino's Star Wars	Animation (Stop Motion)	Profiled by Henry Jenkins.
1998	Godzilla Versus Disco Lando	Animation (Stop Motion)	Screened at Cinequest, Winner: "Best Animation", Microcinefest.
1999	Kung Fu Kenobi's Big Adventure	Animation (Stop Motion)	Screened at International Film Festival Rotterdam, January 1999.
1999	Vert	Mockumentary	First short film shot on digital video.
1999	Les Pantless Menace	Animation (Stop Motion)	First animated short film using digital video.
1999	Buena Vista Fight Club	Animation	Screened at FIFI 2000 (2nd Edition Festival International du Film de L'Internet), Lille.
2000	Fansom the Lizard	Animation	Subject of RES magazine profile; screened on Sundance Channel; Winner: "Best Animated Short Film", 2001 1 Reel Film Festival; Winner: "Best Animated Video", Microcinefest; screened at International Film Festival Rotterdam, January 2001.
2001	AIrplane Glue	Comedy drama	Winner at SeNef 2001, Seoul.
2001	"Red Vines"	Animation, Music Video	Music video for Aimee Mann from "Bachelor No.2".
2002	Icarus of Pittsburgh	Mockumentary	Screened at 2003 Sundance Film Festival.
2003	"Pavlov's Bell"	Animation, Music Video	Music video for Aimee Mann from "Lost In Space".
2003	Bodybags	Comedy drama	Created for 2003 1 Reel Film Festival.
2004	A Fool's Errand	Mockumentary	
2004	My Big Fat Independent Movie	Animation	Animated title sequence for feature film.
2005	The Image of the City	Essay	Adaptation of Kevin Lynch text.
2005	Expressions	Documentary	Documentary portrait of a landscape architect.
2006	Scenic Highway	Essay	Autobiographical Baton Rouge travelogue; Screened at SXSW 2007.
2007	So What?	Documentary	2008 ASLA Communications Honor Award.
2009	A Necessary Ruin: The Story of Buckminster Fuller and the Union Tank Car Dome	Documentary	Funded by grant from the Graham Foundation for Advanced Studies in the Fine Arts; narrated by Frances Anderton; premiered at National Building Museum.
2010	The Patron Saint of Television	Animation	Animated story about Saint Clare of Assisi.
2010	Eagle Rock (Los Angeles) California	Essay	Created for Los Angeles magazine.
2010	39-A: Een Reisverhaal Van Eindeloos (A Travel Tale of Interminable)	Essay	Travelogue to Kennedy Space Center; Winner "Best Documentary" Webcuts.11, Berlin; Screened at SXSW 2011; Dallas International Film Festival.
2011	A Plea For Modernism	Documentary	Narrated by Wendell Pierce.
2011	Telly	Animation	Funded by Kickstarter; Screened at Cinequest and HollyShorts Film Festival.
2012	I Am An Artist	Animation (Stop Motion)	
2012	Building a Sustainable Future	Documentary	Documentary about the Burbank Water and Power EcoCampus.
2012	Olympic & Western: A Primer on the Typographic Order and an Argument for its Proper Usage in the Built Environment	Essay	Screened at Cinequest.
2012	12 Minutes to Vegas	Time-lapse	First time-lapse video experiment.
2013	From Sea to Shining Sea	Time-lapse	First feature film; time-lapse video across United States.
2014	S,M,L,XLA: A Time-Lapse Circumnavigation of Los Angeles	Time-lapse	Time-lapse circumnavigation of Los Angeles.
2015	Hringvegur	Time-lapse	Second feature film; time-lapse circumnavigation of Iceland.
2016	Sic Erat Scriptum	Essay	Screened at 2016 International Festival of Landscape Architecture, Canberra.
2017	My Two Kentuckys	Essay	Travelogue through Midwest via TV Guide.
2017	How to Read an Island	Essay	Aerial land use interpretation of Pelee Island.
2018	World Famous in Poland: Evan Mather and the Making of "Hannah and Her Midichlorians"	Essay	Animated adaptation of Hannah and Her Sisters using Star Wars action figures.
2019	Looking for Mister Solo	Essay	
2019	A Missal for Rapid City	Essay	Creation of TV Guide for Rapid City, South Dakota during Apollo 11.
2020	Sanctum	Essay	Documentary essay about the landscape architectural transformation of Magic Johnson Park and its impact on the adjacent Willowbrook community; 2021 ASLA Communications Honor Award.
