= Everything's Different Now =

Studio album by 'Til Tuesday
- Released: 1988
- Studio: Blue Jay, Carlisle; Bearsville, Woodstock; Power Station, New York City; Division, Boston
- Genre: Pop
- Length: 39:43
- Label: Epic
- Producer: Rhett Davies, Bruce Lampcov

'Til Tuesday chronology
Welcome Home (1986)	Everything's Different Now (1988)	Coming Up Close: A Retrospective (1996)

Everything's Different Now is the third and final studio album by the American band 'Til Tuesday, released in 1988.

== Production ==
The album was produced primarily by Rhett Davies. "'J' for Jules" is about Mann's ex-boyfriend Jules Shear. "The Other End (Of the Telescope)" was cowritten by Elvis Costello.

== Critical reception ==
Professional ratings
Review scores
Source	Rating
AllMusic	4.5/5 stars
New Musical Express	7/10

The Boston Globe called Everything's Different Now "the most confessional album since Bruce Springsteen's Tunnel of Love." USA Today deemed it "a touching meditation on the ebb and flow of love." The Chicago Tribune labeled it a "little masterpiece of melancholy." The Los Angeles Times wrote that "Mann never comes off as a bitter whiner... What comes through in these gentle but not too genteel pop songs is a profound sense of, above all, disappointment."

== Track listing ==
1. "Everything's Different Now" (Jules Shear, Matthew Sweet) – 3:56
2. "Rip in Heaven" (Aimee Mann, Kit Hain) – 3:31
3. "Why Must I" (Mann) – 3:42
4. "'J' for Jules" (Mann) – 4:26
5. "(Believed You Were) Lucky" (Mann, Shear) – 3:38
6. "Limits to Love" (Mann) – 3:36
7. "Long Gone (Buddy)" (Mann, Michael Hausman) – 4:34
8. "The Other End (Of the Telescope)" (Mann, Declan MacManus) – 3:53
9. "Crash and Burn" (Mann, Hain) – 4:46
10. "How Can You Give Up?" (Mann, Hausman) – 3:38

== Personnel ==
'Til Tuesday

- Aimee Mann – vocals, bass and acoustic guitar
- Michael Hausman – drums, percussion and programming
- Robert Holmes – guitars and background vocals
- Michael Montes – keyboards

with:

- Haeryung Shin – violin
- Peter Abrams – French horn
- Marcus Miller – additional bass on "How Can You Give Up?" and "Long Gone (Buddy)"
- Elvis Costello – background vocals on "The Other End (Of the Telescope)"
- Tiger Okoshi – trumpet and horn arrangement on "How Can You Give Up?"
- Hal Crook – trombone on "How Can You Give Up?"
- Mike Denneen – additional keyboards on "How Can You Give Up?"

Technical

- Bruce Lampcov, Mike Denneen, Rhett Davies, Rob Jaczko, Steve Rinkoff – engineer
- Neil Dorfsman, Rhett Davies, Rob Jaczko – mixing
- Lara Rossignol – photography

== Charts ==
Album – Billboard (United States)

Year	Chart	Position
1988	The Billboard 200	124

Singles – Billboard (United States)

Year	Single	Chart	Position
1988	"(Believed You Were) Lucky"	Modern Rock Tracks	30
1989	"(Believed You Were) Lucky"	The Billboard Hot 100	95
