= Welcome Home ('Til Tuesday album) =

Studio album by 'Til Tuesday
- Released: 1986
- Studios: Bearsville, Woodstock
- Length: 40:31
- Label: Epic
- Producer: Rhett Davies

'Til Tuesday chronology
Voices Carry (1985)	Welcome Home (1986)	Everything's Different Now (1988)

Welcome Home is the second studio album by the American band 'Til Tuesday, released in 1986. It peaked at No. 49 on the Billboard 200. The band supported the album with a North American tour.

== Production ==
The album was produced by Rhett Davies. All of its songs were written or cowritten by Aimee Mann.

== Critical reception ==
Professional ratings
Review scores
Source	Rating
AllMusic	4.5/5 stars
Orlando Sentinel	4/5 stars
Sounds	3/5 stars
Windsor Star	C+

The Los Angeles Times wrote that "Mann is adept at writing melancholy lyrics about shattered romance, but they don't have to be set to languid music." The Gazette determined that "none of the members of this East Coast modern pop quartet could put together a decent song if it were written on their beautiful foreheads, and one more video band takes the gas." The Orlando Sentinel called Welcome Home "a warm, sepia-toned collection of tunes that exploit Mann's songwriting abilities." The New York Times concluded that "one by one, the songs just barely steer clear of self-pity... But together, they add up to an album as single-mindededly morose as Frank Sinatra's Only the Lonely." Timothy White in Spin noted that "Mann writes taut yet warmly ironic songs that succeed for their keen subtleties."

== Track listing ==
1. "What About Love" (Mann) – 3:56
2. "Coming Up Close" (Mann) – 4:40
3. "On Sunday" (Hausman, Holmes, Mann, Pesce) – 4:06
4. "Will She Just Fall Down" (Mann) – 2:49
5. "David Denies" (Hausman, Holmes, Mann, Pesce) – 4:50
6. "Lovers' Day" (Mann, Pesce) – 4:19
7. "Have Mercy" (Mann) – 4:55
8. "Sleeping and Waking" (Hausman, Holmes, Mann, Pesce) – 3:24
9. "Angels Never Call" (Mann) – 3:40
10. "No One Is Watching You Now" (Mann) – 3:52

== Personnel ==
'Til Tuesday

- Aimee Mann – vocals and bass
- Joey Pesce – piano, synthesizers, backing vocals
- Robert Holmes – guitars, backing vocals
- Michael Hausman – drums and percussion

Technical

- Mark McKenna, Rhett Davies – engineer
- Bruce Lampcov – engineer, mixing
- Mark Larson – art direction
- Erica Lennard – photography

== Charts ==
Chart (1986)	Peak position
United States (Billboard 200)	49

== Certifications ==
Region	Certification	Certified units/sales
United States (RIAA)	Gold	500,000^{^}
^{^} Shipments figures based on certification alone.
