= Love in a Vacuum =

1985 single by 'Til Tuesday

Single by 'Til Tuesday

from the album Voices Carry
- B-side: "No More Crying"
- Released: 1985
- Length: 3:20 (single version); 3:35 (album version)
- Label: Epic
- Songwriters: Aimee Mann; Michael Hausman; Robert Holmes; Joey Pesce
- Producer: Mike Thorne

'Til Tuesday singles chronology
| "Looking Over My Shoulder" (1985) | "Love in a Vacuum" (1985) | "What About Love" (1986) |

"Love in a Vacuum" is a song by American band 'Til Tuesday, which was released in 1985 as the third and final single from their debut studio album Voices Carry. The song was written by Aimee Mann, Michael Hausman, Robert Holmes and Joey Pesce, and produced by Mike Thorne. "Love in a Vacuum" peaked at No. 88 on the US Cash Box Top 100 Pop Singles chart.

== Background ==
'Til Tuesday first recorded "Love in a Vacuum" in 1983, before they had signed a record deal and shortly after winning the WBCN Rock 'n' Roll Rumble in Boston. The band sent producer and engineer Ian Taylor a demo tape in the hope he would be interested in recording a demo with the band and generate awareness of them through his connections in the music industry. Taylor produced the "Love in a Vacuum" demo which was independently released in 1983 and gained heavy rotation on Boston's WBCN-FM.

The band's victory in the Rock and Roll Rumble, along with the subsequent publicity and local airplay of "Love in a Vacuum", helped gain the attention of Epic Records, who signed the band in 1984. The band's debut album, Voices Carry, was recorded with producer Mike Thorne and included a new recording of "Love in a Vacuum". As the album's third and final single, "Love in a Vacuum" failed to enter the US Billboard Hot 100, but did reach No. 88 on the Cash Box Top 100 Pop Singles chart. Guitarist Robert Holmes told Rolling Stone in 1986, "'Voices Carry' didn't sound like an obvious hit to me. If anything, I thought 'Love in a Vacuum' sounded like a big hit. And that totally died."

== Music video ==
The song's music video was directed and produced by Ken Ross and Richard Levine. It received medium rotation on MTV. The video was influenced by Jean-Luc Godard's 1960 French crime-drama film Breathless. Although Ross and Levine wanted to copy certain scenes and use quotes from the film, Mann insisted the video take a "more improvised" approach.

== Critical reception ==
On its release as a single, Cash Box noted the song's "mysterious Fairlight synthesizer sound" and added that a "fuller production is in evidence on this cut than on the others [from Voices Carry], with a heartier chorus". In a review of Voices Carry, Cheryl Wenner of The Morning Call considered the song "especially worth a listen" and described it as "explosive" and "funky" with its "simple guitar-keyboards interplay".

Eleni P. Austin of The Desert Sun wrote, "Insistent bass lines and hushed harmonies of 'Love in a Vacuum' get the LP off to a good start. Holmes' spacy guitar riffs puncture Mann's dainty vocals as she tells her boyfriend that his technique is wearing thin." Alexandra K. Mann of The Daily Tar Heel noted the band's "beautiful harmonies" which she felt were "especially evident" on "Love in a Vacuum", a song she described as "one of the best on the album".

In a retrospective review of the song, Liana Jonas of AllMusic felt the song was characterized by the "syncopated guitar lines", "driving slap bass" and "undeniably '80s-style synth pop". She added, "Mann emotionally and strongly sings of being stifled in an unhealthy relationship." Joe Viglione, in an AllMusic review of Voices Carry, was critical of Thorne's production on the song in comparison to the "inspired and innovative" 1983 demo. Viglione noted, "The original was perfect, [but] the Thorne version is over-produced, creating a good album track when the true follow-up hit was actually in hand."

== Track listing ==
7" single

1. "Love in a Vacuum" – 3:20
2. "No More Crying" – 4:18

7" single (US promo)

1. "Love in a Vacuum" (Single Remix) – 3:20
2. "Love in a Vacuum" (Long Version) – 3:35

12" (US promo)

1. "Love in a Vacuum" (Single Remix) – 3:20
2. "Love in a Vacuum" (Long Version) – 3:35

== Personnel ==
'Til Tuesday

- Aimee Mann – vocals, bass
- Robert Holmes – guitar, backing vocals
- Joey Pesce – synthesizer, backing vocals
- Michael Hausman – drums, percussion

Production

- Mike Thorne – producer
- William Wittman – single remix of "Love in a Vacuum"
- Domenic Maita – engineer
- Mike Krowiak, Jeff Lippay – studio assistants
- Harvey Goldberg – mixing engineer
- Moira Marquis – mixing assistant
- Jack Skinner – mastering

Other

- Deborah Feingold – photography

== Charts ==
| Chart (1985) | Peak position |
|---|---|
| US Cash Box Top 100 Pop Singles | 88 |
