= Coming Up Close =

'Til Tuesday song

Single by 'Til Tuesday

from the album Welcome Home
- B-side: "Angels Never Call"
- Released: 1986
- Length: 4:08 (single version); 4:37 (album version)
- Label: Epic
- Songwriter(s): Aimee Mann
- Producer(s): Rhett Davies

'Til Tuesday singles chronology
"What About Love" (1986)	"Coming Up Close" (1986)	"(Believed You Were) Lucky" (1988)

"Coming Up Close" is a song by American band 'Til Tuesday, which was released in 1986 as the second and final single from their second studio album Welcome Home. The song was written by Aimee Mann and produced by Rhett Davies. "Coming Up Close" peaked at No. 59 on the US Billboard Hot 100.

== Background ==
"Coming Up Close" was one of the earliest songs Mann wrote using an acoustic guitar rather than a bass guitar. Mann wrote the song during the time the band was on tour as the opening act for Hall & Oates in March–April 1985.

'Til Tuesday had wanted "Coming Up Close" to be the first single from Welcome Home, rather than "What About Love". Mann told The Atlanta Constitution in 1986, "I really love 'Coming Up Close' and we did want it to be the first single. But we sort of realized that 'What About Love' was more immediate." The album and its two singles achieved modest commercial success in the United States, but did not live up to the expectations of Epic Records or the band. Mann told Cash Box in 1989: "'Coming Up Close' made people nervous 'cause there were no other songs like it on the charts; now there are. We could've been groundbreakers, I think, if Welcome Home had gotten the attention it deserved."

== Music video ==
The song's music video was directed by Bob McKinnon and produced by McKinnon and Siegel. It received heavy rotation on MTV.

== Critical reception ==
On its release, Billboard described "Coming Up Close" as a "nostalgic rock song" and "contemplative follow-up" to "What About Love" which "incorporates elements of both country and western". Cash Box considered the song to be a "country-flavored and richly textured mid-tempo track" which has "an airy, evocative ambience that yields to a riveting chorus". They praised Mann's vocal for being "earnest", "charming" and "spellbinding". Bill Nowak of The Sheboygan Press gave the song a three and a half star rating out of four and described it as a "very fine song" which should put the band "back on track" commercially.

In a review of Welcome Home, Jim Sullivan of The Boston Globe praised "Coming Up Close" as "the best song the wispy-voiced Mann has written". He added, "A gentle, countryish song, it has a catchy, calming lilt and a feeling of resonant hope." Bill Hendersen of The Orlando Sentinel commented: "On songs like 'Coming Up Close' and 'Angels Never Call,' Mann has laid her influences and vulnerabilities on the table for everyone to see. Sure, the songs contain the all-important modern dance rhythms, but they also carry subtle country undertones that give them unusual twists."

L. Kent Wolgamott of the Lincoln Journal Star considered "Coming Up Close" to be a "direct personal song, something most new bands avoid like the plague". Richard Thompson of the Santa Cruz Sentinel considered the "haunting" song to be "about a love affair that never takes off". In a retrospective review of the song, Stewart Mason of AllMusic noted the "detail-filled lyrics" that "sound like a Raymond Carver story set to music", and the "haunting hints of emotions" which are "resolved in an equally elliptical but much more direct and yearning chorus".

== Track listing ==
7" single

1. "Coming Up Close" – 4:08
2. "Angels Never Call" – 3:38

7" single (Japanese release)

1. "Coming Up Close" – 4:08
2. "Yesterday" – 3:38

7" single (US promo)

1. "Coming Up Close" – 4:08
2. "Coming Up Close" – 4:08

12" (US promo)

1. "Coming Up Close" – 4:37
2. "Coming Up Close" – 4:08

12" (Dutch release)

1. "Coming Up Close" – 4:08
2. "Angels Never Call" – 3:38
3. "No One Is Watching You Now" – 3:53

== Personnel ==
'Til Tuesday

- Aimee Mann – vocals, bass
- Robert Holmes – guitar, backing vocals
- Joey Pesce – synthesizer, backing vocals
- Michael Hausman – drums, percussion

Production

- Rhett Davies – producer and engineer (all tracks)
- Bruce Lampcov – mixing and engineer on "Coming Up Close" and "Angels Never Call"
- Mark McKenna – engineering on "Coming Up Close" and "Angels Never Call", mixing on "Yesterday"
- Bob Ludwig, Bill Kipper – mastering

== Charts ==
Chart (1986–87)	Peak position
US Billboard Hot 100	59
US Mainstream Rock (Billboard)	37
US Cash Box Top 100 Pop Singles	74
