= Prey for Rock & Roll =

2003 film directed by Alex Steyermark

- Film poster
- Directed by: Alex Steyermark
- Written by: Cheri Lovedog; Robin Whitehouse
- Based on: Prey for Rock & Roll by Cheri Lovedog
- Produced by: Gina Gershon; Alexis Magagni-Seely; Donovan Mannato; Gina Resnick
- Starring: Gina Gershon; Drea de Matteo; Lori Petty; Shelly Cole
- Cinematography: Antonio Calvache
- Edited by: Allyson C. Johnson
- Music by: Stephen Trask
- Production company: Prey LLC
- Distributed by: Kino Lorber
- Release dates: January 20, 2003 (Sundance); October 3, 2003 (United States)
- Running time: 104 minutes
- Country: United States
- Language: English
- Budget: $1.5 million

Prey For Rock & Roll is a 2003 American drama film directed by Alex Steyermark and written by Cheri Lovedog and Robin Whitehouse. The film, which stars Gina Gershon, Drea de Matteo, Lori Petty, Shelly Cole, and Marc Blucas, follows the story of Jacki and her all-girl punk rock band, Clam Dandy. The film is adapted from a semi-autobiographical play of the same name by Lovedog, who founded an LA punk band in the 1980s.

The film had its world premiere at the 2003 Sundance Film Festival and was given a limited release on October 3, 2003.

== Plot ==
Jacki, the frontwoman for Clam Dandy, an all-girl punk rock band in Los Angeles, is on the verge of turning forty. The band which includes bassist Tracy, lead guitarist Faith, and drummer Sally, has been scraping by for over a decade without managing to land a good record deal. Jacki must decide if she wants to keep plugging away at dreams of stardom or to throw in the towel and devote herself full-time to the tattoo parlor where she works. Along the way, the women are rocked by personal tragedies that threaten to break up the band before they can get their last shot at success.

== Cast ==
- Gina Gershon as Jacki
- Drea de Matteo as Tracy
- Lori Petty as Faith
- Shelly Cole as Sally
- Marc Blucas as Animal
- Ashley Drane as Punk rock girl
- Eddie Driscoll as Chuck
- Shakara Ledard as Jessica
- Ivan Martin as Nick
- Nancy Pimental as Natalie
- Greg Rikaart as Scott
- Sandra Seacat as Jacki's mom
- Francois Harold as Johnny
- Benjamín Benítez as drug dealer
- Joannah Portman as sorority girl 1
- Hallie King as sorority girl 2

== Production ==
Cheri Lovedog wrote the stage musical Prey for Rock & Roll based on her own experiences fronting the punk band Lovedog, who opened for groups like Jane’s Addiction, Hole, L7 and X in the 1980s and early 1990s. The musical was staged in the summer of 2000 at New York's CBGB club. For the film adaptation, Lovedog did not want actresses to lip-sync to another singer's vocals. Director Alex Steyermark, who had previously served as the music supervisor for films like Malcolm X and Hedwig and the Angry Inch, suggested Gina Gershon after seeing her perform on Broadway in a revival of Cabaret.

Gina Gershon did all of her own singing in the film and also came on board as a producer.

Joan Jett was a consultant on the film and gave Gershon guitar lessons, but ended up leaving the production after a pay dispute that culminated in a lawsuit.

The filming began on May 16, 2002, in Los Angeles.

== Release ==
The film first screened at the 2003 Sundance Film Festival. That March, it was acquired for distribution by MAC Releasing and was given a limited theatrical release beginning October 3.

To promote the film, Gershon went on an eight-city tour with a backup band and sang a mix of songs from the film, covers, and her own material. The tour was documented for the 2004 six-part IFC reality show, Rocked with Gina Gershon.

In June 2024, distributor Kino Lorber released a restored version of the film in select theaters in North America, and subsequently on Blu-Ray disc and streaming.

== Reception ==
On review aggregator website Rotten Tomatoes, the film has a 57% approval rating based on 49 reviews. On Metacritic, Prey for Rock & Roll has a weighted average score of 48 out of a 100 based on 18 reviews, indicating "mixed or average reviews".

Reviews praised the film for capturing "the flavor of band life", as well as Gershon, with Stephen Holden of The New York Times writing, "Ms. Gershon's hot-wired performance infuses Prey for Rock and Roll with a bracing charge of authenticity." In a review that gave the film a "B" grade, Owen Gleiberman of Entertainment Weekly called the film "ingratiatingly scrappy" and said "there’s a tough and appealing vitality to the way that it embraces the petty ego-tripping and party-down squalor of the rock lifestyle and stands apart from it at the same time." Ronnie Scheib of Variety commended the film's "totally lived-in smart-mouth dialogue and...wicked sense of humor."

Praise was also given to Lori Petty, who Mick LaSalle of the San Francisco Chronicle said "brings an engaging, quirky humanity", Drea de Matteo, and Shelly Cole. Loren King of the Chicago Tribune appreciated the film's view into the rock music scene from a woman's perspective, writing it "allows the actresses to rock out in rehearsals and on nightclub stages in a believable way, creating an authentic band dynamic fraught with complex relationships to the music--and to each other." King also noted, "Jacki's anything-goes sexuality (she dates both a woman and a male ex-con) is part of her restless, spirited character, not a gratuitous attempt to portray women rockers as wild and crazy."

King concluded the film is ultimately "about survival--but it's also about doing what you were born to do (and, as Petty's character puts it, the only thing you know how to do.) It's a raw and raucous rock story that, for once, gets the big picture and the small details right."

Criticisms centered on some of the subplots as melodramatic and clichéd. Some opinions were also divided on the music of the film; while some critics said Gershon "[delivers] the goods with a strong, husky voice and style to spare", and that the songs are "better-than-average punk anthems in late 80's style", others said "the musical numbers are the only real drag on this otherwise odd and appealing picture."
