= Voices Carry =

1985 single by 'Til Tuesday

Single by 'Til Tuesday

from the album Voices Carry
- B-side: "Are You Serious?"
- Released: March 28, 1985
- Recorded: 1985
- Studio: R.P.M. Sound Studios (New York City)
- Genre: Pop; new wave
- Length: 4:20
- Label: Epic
- Songwriters: Robert Holmes; Aimee Mann; Michael Hausman · Joey Pesce
- Producer: Mike Thorne

'Til Tuesday singles chronology
"Voices Carry" (1985)	"Looking Over My Shoulder" (1985)

Music video
- "Voices Carry" on YouTube

"Voices Carry" is a song by the American rock band 'Til Tuesday. It was produced by Mike Thorne for the band's debut studio album, Voices Carry (1985). The accompanying music video, directed by D.J. Webster, received wide exposure on MTV and positive reactions from critics. It was nominated for numerous awards and is thought to be the reason behind the song's success. It was released in North America in March 1985. "Voices Carry" became the band's highest-charting single and their only top ten hit in the U.S., peaking at number eight on the Billboard Hot 100. Internationally it reached the top twenty in Canada and Australia.

== Writing and lyrics ==
One claim for the inspiration for the song says that an argument between Michael Hausman and bandmate/former girlfriend Aimee Mann inspired the song's lyrics, but producer Mike Thorne disputes this and states the lyrics originally had Mann singing to another woman and that the gender was changed due to pressure from Epic Records. Ministry frontman Al Jourgensen claims that the song was inspired by a brief relationship he had with Mann while living in Boston. Mann later stated that she wrote the song about a female acquaintance, and wrote the song from a male's point of view. Mann also stated that the rewritten verse in the studio version that begins with "He wants me but only part of the time" was based "on something I was going through with a relationship at the time."

== Recording and production ==
"Voices Carry"
A 26-second sample from "Voices Carry", featuring Mann singing the last part of the song while the rest of the band provides the background vocals.

"Voices Carry" was recorded in 1985 at RPM Sound Studios in New York. The song is about past sour relationships, and was originally written and sung by Aimee Mann as to a woman. 'Til Tuesday rehearsed that format in Boston the previous summer, but Epic was unhappy with the lyrics; they thought that it was a "very powerful, commercial song", and wanted to remove the lesbian components to appeal to the mainstream market.

Despite the pressure to replace the lyrics, producer Mike Thorne thought that "it didn't matter any to the impact of the song itself", though the band eventually changed the gender of the love interest. At the beginning, 'Til Tuesday and Thorne were undecided between "Love in a Vacuum" and "Looking Over My Shoulder" to be released as the first single, but ultimately Epic's artist and repertoire (A&R) executive Dick Wingate chose "Voices Carry", because it "define[d] precisely the band and its style". According to Thorne, his contract stated that he had the right to be the first to remix the song for the 7" single release. He was then told that it had been remixed by Bob Clearmountain; about this he commented, "not what the rules were ... but it sounded pretty good, as well it might coming from one of the finest American engineer/producers".

== Critical reception ==
"Voices Carry" received generally positive reviews from pop music critics. In a review of the band's second album Welcome Home, David Wild from Rolling Stone magazine said that their "debut [album], Voices Carry, had its icy charms", calling the song "wonderfully eerie". Allmusic's Stewart Mason said that "'Voices Carry' is one of the most distinctive radio singles of its era"; he also praised the production saying that it "does wonders both for Mann's breathy voice and the ... chorus, which brilliantly releases the tension that builds throughout the stark, paranoid verses". Joe Viglione also from Allmusic, in a review of their debut album said that the song is "captivating", and praised its production saying that Mike Thorne did “excellent work.” Phillip Mottaz of The Tripwire believed that the song "has everything that makes a song fun and effective", and felt that it is a "testament to honest production and emotional quality".

Dennis Hunt of the Los Angeles Times said that Mann has "a distinct naturalism [that] governs her vocals" and that "the frailty, roughness and lack of great range in her voice ... [is] genuinely appealing", adding that if she were a "polished singer, songs like 'Voices Carry' ... wouldn't be half as appealing"; while Robert Hilburn of the same newspaper said that Mann "exhibits winning vocal authority on record", adding that the "only thing she needs is another Dave Stewart to give her more tailored and absorbing arrangements and material". Lynn Van Matre of the Chicago Tribune said that "much of the group's material falls into the dance rock category", adding that the "bluesy title cut, ... 'Voices Carry', was particularly impressive". Brent Mann, in his book 99 Red Balloons... called it "the quintessential New Wave song", and felt that "Mann's cool, dark lead vocals were right in step with the style".

== Chart performance ==
"Voices Carry" was released in the United States in March 1985. It first appeared on the Bubbling Under Hot 100 Singles chart at number four, the next week it debuted at number eighty-one on the Billboard Hot 100. It reached a peak position of number eight in its fourteenth week, and stayed twenty-one weeks on the chart, becoming the band's first and only top ten single in the United States. The success of the single helped their debut album reach the top twenty on the Billboard 200 chart, and pushed it past the gold mark.

In Canada, the single entered the RPM singles chart in June 1985 at number ninety-four, peaked at number fifteen for two weeks in August 1985, stayed twenty-two weeks in total, and was certified gold by the Canadian Recording Industry Association (CRIA). In Australia, "Voices Carry" entered the Kent Music Report on June 17, 1985; it peaked at number fifteen, and spent fourteen weeks on the chart.

== Music video ==
Mann's character lashes out at her boyfriend during a concert at Carnegie Hall. She stands up from her seat and removes her cap to reveal her spiky hair, stunning the audience.

The music video for "Voices Carry" was directed by D.J. Webster, and filmed at Dorchester's Strand Theater, Davio's Restaurant, and W. Brookline St in Boston. The video inserts several spoken or silent short, dramatic scenes on top of the song. The band's lead singer, Aimee Mann, plays a musician with an abusive boyfriend, played by actor Cully Holland. He demeans her music "hobby", demands she change her look to fit his respectable, 1980s professional caste lifestyle and demands, "Why can't you for once do something for me?" before essentially forcing himself upon her. The conclusion shows them formally dressed in an elite Carnegie Hall audience, the boyfriend giving Mann a disgusted look when he finds a visibly counter-culture rattail peeking from her black lace cap. Finally having enough, Mann begins singing the song in her seat, increasing in volume and creating a scene. Her character is no longer submissive as she defiantly stands to belt the final lyrics, "He said, shut up! He said, shut up! Oh God, can't you keep it down?...".

The success of the single was largely attributed to the video, which received wide exposure on MTV and local Boston UHF music video channel V-66, along with positive reactions from critics and nominations to numerous awards. Keith Thomas of Knight Ridder newspapers called the video "a clever and stunning effort". Praising the dialogue and acting he said that it "looks better than most feature films", adding that "everything about the clip is grand". Robert Hilburn of the Los Angeles Times also praised Mann's acting, saying that she appears "marvelously charismatic" in it, while Dennis Hunt from the same newspaper said that it was "cleverly conceived". Debbie del Condo of the Orlando Sentinel called it the "Most Memorable Video of 1985", and added that she will "keep waiting for their next video". In his book Totally awesome 80s, author Matthew Rettenmund called it a "great story video". Author Brent Mann in his book 99 Red Balloons..., called the video "pure New Wave" and added that it was "perfect for MTV and VH1 consumption".

At the 1985 MTV Video Music Awards, the band won the award for Best New Artist in a video. The same year, at the Fourth Annual American Video Awards, Mann was named the Best Female Performer in a video for "Voices Carry". The video was placed number forty on Slant Magazine's 2003 list of the "100 Greatest Music Videos", and was listed on Pitchfork's "100 Awesome Music Videos", in 2006.

The 2012 music video for "Labrador", the second single from her album Charmer, features a satirical shot-for-shot remake of "Voices Carry" video within the framing device of Mann having been forced to shoot the video after inadvertently signing complete control of the video over to director Tom Scharpling. The video features Jon Wurster as the Wall Street boyfriend, Jon Hamm as Scharpling, and Ted Leo in a cameo.

== Formats and track listing ==
These are the formats and track listings of major single releases of "Voices Carry":

- 7" Single: Australia/North America
1. "Voices Carry" – 4:19
2. "Are You Serious?" – 3:15
- 12" Maxi-Single: Netherlands
1. "Voices Carry" – 4:19
2. "Are You Serious?" – 3:15
3. "Sleep" – 3:40
- 12" Maxi-Single: North America
1. "Voices Carry" (Long version) – 4:19
2. "Voices Carry" (Single mix) – 3:59

== Credits and personnel ==
- Aimee Mann – lead vocals, backing vocals, bass
- Robert Holmes - electric guitar, backing vocals
- Joey Pesce – synthesizers, backing vocals
- Michael Hausman – drums

== Charts ==
Chart (1985–1986)	Peak position
Australian Kent Music Report	15
Canadian RPM Singles Chart	15
US Billboard Hot 100	8
US Radio & Records CHR/Pop Airplay Chart	7
US Billboard Top Rock Tracks	14

Year-end chart (1985)	Rank
US Top Pop Singles (Billboard)	68

== Cover versions ==
American hardcore punk band Gang Green covered the song on their 1986 album Another Wasted Night.

American singer Tiffany covered the song on her compilation album Greatest Hits of the '80s and Beyond, released on May 30, 2011. The album included a string of '80s song covers.

On July 30, 2018, singer/songwriter Sky Ferreira released a demo of her cover on SoundCloud. Ferreira later released a more produced '(Alternative Version)' which appeared on YouTube.

On August 28, 2024, American actress and singer/songwriter Kate Hudson released her cover version of the song. Hudson had previously performed the song on The Howard Stern Show in May 2024.
