= Brittany Shane =

American singer-songwriter

- Born: January 4, 1977 (age 49); Baraboo, WI, U.S.
- Genres: Rock
- Occupation: Singer-songwriter
- Instruments: Vocals, guitar
- Years active: 2000–present
- Website: www.brittanyshane.com

Brittany Shane is an American singer-songwriter and musician based in Austin, Texas. The Wisconsin-born and raised songstress blends rock and pop with poetry. She got her start performing at The Fillmore in San Francisco, California in 2000, playing acoustic in the Poster Room before acts such as The Wallflowers, Aimee Mann, Chris Isaak and Liz Phair graced the mainstage. After the release of her album, Have Heart Live Young (2010), she opened for Heart, Foreigner and Peter Frampton as well as headlining her own local shows around the Bay Area.

Her first San Francisco released CD, Decked Out (2005), was selected by Aidin Vaziri, of the San Francisco Chronicle, as one of his top local CDs of 2005.

Her first two recordings, Out of the Everywhere (1999) and Moravian Star (2000) were released under her maiden name Brittany Safranek (Shane is her middle name) while attending the University of Wisconsin–Madison.

Shane released her new CD Have Heart Live Young on her own 'Painted Lady Records' in September 2010.

Shane has worked with top-notch music makers, including Grammy-nominated mix engineer, Joe Chiccarelli and producer Zack Smith (who founded the 1980s band Scandal). Her music suggests Brit cult group The Sundays, The Bangles, Beth Orton or Mazzy Star.

Several of the songs on Decked Out and Have Heart Live Young provide much of the score to the multi-award-winning indie film, The Village Barbershop, starring John Ratzenberger (Cliff Clavin from Cheers) and Shelly Cole. The film, called "warm, humorous and ingratiating" by Variety, was released nationally in cinemas in March 2009 by Monterey Media.

Shane's songs TV placements include: A national Hyundai commercial (2008), Bad Girls Club (Oxygen Channel) (2008), Living Lohan (Oxygen Channel) (2008) and Parking Wars (A&E) (2009), Daytripper (PBS) (2013), After Happily Ever After (PBS) (2013), Rizzoli & Isles (TNT) (2014).

She was a KFOG Radio Spotlight Artist in the fall of 2008 and the San Francisco Chronicle's Fresh Artist in May 2008.

Shane promoted her album Have Heart Live Young on her first US Tour from November 2009 – August 2010 with 80 dates across the U.S. Aidin Vaziri featured her tour as a main music article in the Pink Pages of the San Francisco Chronicle.

Her song, "Dream Baby Dream" from her album Have Heart Live Young is about Lana Clarkson.

She released her fifth album, Loud Nights on a Short String (2012) which was produced by Austin music greats Scrappy Jud Newcomb and George Reiff, who also played guitar and bass on the CD, along with Dony Wynn playing drums and Johnny Goudie on keyboards.

Shane released Brittany Shane EP (2018). She is currently releasing new singles each month. Her new songs "Texas Boy" and "Holiday Letter" are in rotation on KOOP and Wimberly Valley Radio and can be heard on her website at www.brittanyshane.com
