= The Village Barbershop =

- Film poster
- Directed by: Chris J. Ford
- Written by: Chris J. Ford
- Starring: John Ratzenberger and Shelly Cole
- Distributed by: Monterey Media
- Release date: February 29, 2008 (Cinequest)
- Country: United States
- Language: English

The Village Barbershop is a 2008 independent film written and directed by Chris J. Ford, starring John Ratzenberger and Shelly Cole. Ratzenberger plays Art Leroldi, a Reno barber forced to hire a new employee, Gloria MacIntyre, played by Cole, after the death of his longtime business partner. Faced with losing his shop, Gloria helps Art get his life and business back on track with her feisty, determined attitude.

The film premiered at the 2008 Cinequest Film Festival.

== Plot ==
Years earlier, Art lost his wife to cancer, a painful wound he nurses by excessive drinking and going to the sportsbook (which is where he met his wife) every day. Gloria has her own issues when she finds herself homeless and pregnant by her loser boyfriend, who has decided to leave her for another woman, and take the trailer they live in. However, she soon strikes up a relationship with Colin, a neighborhood barista who is determined to win her over despite her initial reluctance. Art's lonely existence is then brightened when he runs into Josie, an old acquaintance, at a gentleman's club where she works as a waitress.

In what he thinks is a fait accompli, the shop's greedy and sleazy landlord, Jacobi (Amos Glick), sells the property to Big-Mart, and the barbers are forced to relocate. But all turns out well in the end, and Art exacts mischievous revenge on Jacobi, who gets his just reward.

== Cast ==
- John Ratzenberger as Art Leroldi
- Shelly Cole as Gloria MacIntyre
- Cindy Pickett as Josie
- George McRae as George
- Daron Jennings as Colin
- Amos Glick as Jacobi
- Josh Hutchinson as Rickert
- Bob Saenz as Wilson

== Production ==
Per ending credits, the film was shot entirely in Reno, Nevada; Napa, California; and Petaluma, California. The soundtrack makes extensive use of music by Brittany Shane and Bob Spector.

== Reception ==
Won the Audience Award for Best Picture by Cinequest in 2008 and the Best Actress Award for Cole at the Newport Beach Film Festival that same year. An Official Selection at a number of film festivals, it is a sweet film that Variety called "Warm, humorous, and ingratiating".

On the review aggregator Rotten Tomatoes, the film holds an approval rating of 80%, based on five reviews with an average rating of 6.7/10.
