= Shelly Cole =

American actress

- Born: August 22, 1975 (age 49); Texas, U.S.
- Occupation: Actress
- Years active: 2000–2018

Shelly Cole is a former American actress.

== Career ==
Born in Texas, Cole commenced her acting career appearing in TV movies and TV series. In 2003, she landed a main role in the film, Prey for Rock & Roll. One of her best-known roles was Madeline Lynn in Gilmore Girls from 2000 to 2004.

After retiring from acting, Cole has worked as an acting coach in Denver, Colorado. In 2018, she directed an independent film entitled Body Keepers.

== Filmography ==
=== Film ===
Year	Title	Role	Notes
2003	Prey for Rock & Roll	Sally	
2006	Art School Confidential	Filthy-Haired Girl	
2008	The Village Barbershop	Gloria MacIntyre	
2009	Dark House	Lily	
2010	How to Make Love to a Woman	Nanette	

=== Television ===
Year	Title	Role	Notes
2000	The Princess & the Barrio Boy	Homeless girl	Television film
2000	The Theory of Everything	Janice	Television film
2000–2002	Boston Public	Susan	3 episodes
2000–2004	Gilmore Girls	Madeline Lynn	33 episodes
2001	The Guardian	April Evans	Episode: "Lolita?"
2001	ER	Laura Avery	Episode: "Supplies and Demands"
2002	NYPD Blue	Baby Doll	Episode: "Safari, So Good"
2003	8 Simple Rules	Christina	Episode: "Kerry's Big Adventure"
2004	The Men's Room	Charlotte	4 episodes
2004	Strong Medicine	Gina Perry	Episode: "Life in the Balance"
2005	Joan of Arcadia	Punk Girl God	Episode: "Common Thread"
2005	Without a Trace	Nicki Tyler	Episode: "From the Ashes"
2006	Cold Case	May Pierson (1988)	Episode: "8 Years"
2006	CSI: NY	Elva	Episode: "Stuck on You"
2007	NCIS	Bernadette Watson	Episode: "Angel of Death"
2007	Criminal Minds	Anna	Episode: "Doubt"
2009	Monk	Edie Kazarinski	Episode: "Mr. Monk and the End"
2010	House	Nurse Maldonado	Episode: "Lockdown"
