= Magnolia (soundtrack) =

1999 soundtrack album

Magnolia: Music from the Motion Picture

Soundtrack album by Aimee Mann
- Released: December 7, 1999
- Genres: Pop, rock
- Length: 50:49
- Label: Reprise
- Producers: Jon Brion; Buddy Judge; Aimee Mann; Brendan O'Brien; Michael Penn

Aimee Mann chronology
I'm with Stupid (1995)	Magnolia: Music from the Motion Picture (1999)	Bachelor No. 2 (2000)

Singles from Magnolia: Music from the Motion Picture
- 1. "Save Me" Released: 1999

Magnolia: Music from the Motion Picture is the soundtrack album to the 1999 film Magnolia. It comprises nine songs by Aimee Mann, plus tracks by Gabrielle, Supertramp and Jon Brion. The album received positive reviews and was certified gold in 2001. Mann's song "Save Me" was nominated for an Academy Award for Best Original Song.

== Music ==
The music of Aimee Mann inspired the director Paul Thomas Anderson to write Magnolia; he said he "sat down to write an adaptation of Aimee Mann songs". Mann wrote two songs for Magnolia: "You Do" and "Save Me". "Deathly", "Driving Sideways" and "You Do" also appeared on Mann's following album, Bachelor No. 2. "Nothing Is Good Enough", here an instrumental, appears in lyrical form on that album. (Bachelor also includes "Red Vines", a song Mann wrote about Anderson.) "One" is a cover of the 1968 song by Harry Nilsson, recorded for the 1995 tribute album For the Love of Harry: Everybody Sings Nilsson.

Magnolia features a sequence in which the characters sing along to Mann's song "Wise Up". Mann originally recorded "Wise Up" for the 1996 film Jerry Maguire, but the director, Cameron Crowe, felt it did not fit. According to Crowe, he had used Mann's original piano demo in a scene in which Jerry Maguire is moving through an airport. Mann's final version was "larger, more lush, more of a personal epic, and quite incredible... suddenly it was too big for the scene it was meant for." He said not being able to use it was "heartbreaking". The song was included on the Jerry Maguire soundtrack album.

== Reception ==
Professional ratings
Review scores
Source	Rating
AllMusic	4.5/5 stars
The Austin Chronicle	4/5 stars
Christgau's Consumer Guide	(1-star Honorable Mention)
Los Angeles Times	3/4 stars
NME	4/10
Q	4/5 stars
Rolling Stone	4/5 stars
The Rolling Stone Album Guide	3.5/5 stars

By February 2001, the soundtrack had sold 410,000 units in the United States. Mann's song "Save Me" was nominated for an Academy Award for Best Original Song, losing to Phil Collins's song "You'll Be in My Heart" from Tarzan. In 2021, the Los Angeles Times described "Save Me" as Mann's masterpiece, which "solidified Mann's stature as an esteemed songwriter". The success of the Magnolia soundtrack caused Mann stress, as she felt pressure to capitalize on it and tour heavily. In a 2020 retrospective, Alex McLevy of The A.V. Club praised the film for widening Mann's audience and the unique way that the writing of the film coincided with her songwriting.

== Track listing ==
All songs performed by Aimee Mann, except where noted.

No.	Title	Writer(s)	Length
1.	"One"	Harry Nilsson	2:53
2.	"Momentum"	Aimee Mann	3:27
3.	"Build That Wall"	Mann; Jon Brion	4:25
4.	"Deathly"	Mann	5:28
5.	"Driving Sideways"	Mann; Michael Lockwood	3:47
6.	"You Do"	Mann	3:41
7.	"Nothing Is Good Enough"	Mann	3:10
8.	"Wise Up"	Mann	3:31
9.	"Save Me"	Mann	4:35
10.	"Goodbye Stranger" (performed by Supertramp)	Rick Davies; Roger Hodgson	5:50
11.	"The Logical Song" (performed by Supertramp)	Davies; Hodgson	4:07
12.	"Dreams" (performed by Gabrielle)	Gabrielle; Tim Laws	3:43
13.	"Magnolia" (performed by Jon Brion)	Brion	2:12
Total length:			50:49

== Charts and certifications ==
=== Charts ===
Chart (2000)	Peak position
Canada (RPM)	21
Germany (Media Control AG)	42
US Billboard 200	58
US Top Internet Albums (Billboard)	4

=== Year-end charts ===
Year-end chart performance for Magnolia
Chart (2000)	Position
Canadian Albums (Nielsen SoundScan)	187

=== Certifications ===
Region	Certification	Certified units/sales
United States (RIAA)	Gold	500,000^{^}
^{^} Shipments figures based on certification alone.
