= Stupid Thing (Aimee Mann song) =

Single by Aimee Mann

from the album Whatever
- B-side: "I've Had It"
- Released: 1993
- Length: 4:28
- Label: Imago
- Songwriter(s): Aimee Mann; Jon Brion
- Producer(s): Jon Brion

Aimee Mann singles chronology
"I Should've Known" (1993)	"Stupid Thing" (1993)	"I Should've Known (reissue)" (1994)

"Stupid Thing" is a song by American singer-songwriter Aimee Mann, which was released in 1993 as the second single from her debut studio album Whatever. The song was written by Mann and Jon Brion, and produced by Brion. "Stupid Thing" peaked at No. 47 in the UK Singles Chart and remained in the Top 100 for two weeks.

== Background ==
Speaking of the song, Mann told Tony Clayton-Lea of the Sunday Tribune in 1993, "Most of 'Stupid Thing' comes from a particular relationship and the frustration someone would feel because they're stopping something before it's even started."

== Critical reception ==
Tony Clayton-Lea of the Sunday Tribune commented that "Stupid Thing" was "about the way in which some relationships break apart before they've been given the chance to properly knit together". He added, "Mann matches the unfairness of the situation with an inherent hopelessness that is astoundingly accurate". In a review of Whatever, Kara Manning of Rolling Stone noted the song "aptly targets a disappointing lover from the perspective of his 'dear departed'". John Mackie of the Vancouver Sun described the song as a "sad and beautiful ballad, with a killer chorus".

== Track listing ==
7" and cassette single (UK release)

1. "Stupid Thing" - 4:28
2. "I've Had It" - 4:15

Cassette single (US release)

1. "Stupid Thing" - 4:28
2. "Say Anything" (Acoustic) - 3:45
3. "I've Had It" - 4:15

CD single (UK release #1)

1. "Stupid Thing" - 4:28
2. "Baby Blue" - 3:50
3. "The Other End (Of the Telescope)" (Live) - 4:03
4. "Say Anything" (Live) - 3:48

CD single (UK release #2)

1. "Stupid Thing" (Live) - 4:29
2. "Put Me on Top" (Live) - 3:36
3. "4th of July" (Live) - 3:15
4. "I Should've Known" (Live) - 4:33

CD single (US release)

1. "Stupid Thing" - 4:28
2. "Say Anything" (Acoustic) - 3:45
3. "I've Had It" - 4:15

== Personnel ==
Stupid Thing

- Aimee Mann – vocals, bass
- Jon Brion – electric guitar, piano, harmonium, organ, chamberlin
- Buddy Judge – acoustic guitar
- Jim Keltner – drums

Production

- Jon Brion – producer of "Stupid Thing", "I've Had It", "Say Anything" (Acoustic) and "Baby Blue"
- Aimee Mann, Michael Hausman – producers of "I've Had It"
- Bob Clearmountain – mixing on "Stupid Thing", "I've Had It", "Say Anything" (Acoustic) and "Baby Blue"
- Michael Reiter – assistant mixer on "Stupid Thing"
- Laurence Diane – engineer on "The Other End (Of the Telescope" (Live), "Say Anything" (Live), "Put Me on Top" (Live) and "4th of July" (Live)
- Mike Deenan – engineer on "Stupid Thing" (Live) and "I Should've Known" (Live)
- Bob Ludwig – mastering

Other

- Anton Corbijn – photography

== Charts ==
Chart (1993)	Peak position
UK Singles (OCC)	47
