= Choice in the Matter =

1996 song by Aimee Mann

Single by Aimee Mann

from the album I'm with Stupid
- Released: 1996
- Length: 3:13
- Label: Geffen
- Songwriter(s): Aimee Mann; Jon Brion
- Producer(s): Jon Brion

Aimee Mann singles chronology
"That's Just What You Are" (1994)	"Choice in the Matter" (1996)	"Long Shot" (1996)

"Choice in the Matter" is a song by American singer-songwriter Aimee Mann, which was released in 1996 as the second single from her second studio album I'm with Stupid. The song was written by Mann and Jon Brion, and produced by Brion.

"Choice in the Matter" was released as a promotional-only single in the United States and United Kingdom. In April 1996, it peaked at No. 12 in the US Billboard Adult Alternative Songs chart.

== Background ==
Speaking to Chris Rubin of the San Francisco Chronicle in 1996, Mann said the song was about "someone realizing almost immediately that the person they're contemplating becoming involved with is not to be trusted". She added, "You can say to yourself, 'There is no choice, I can't get involved.' Problem solved. There is no possibility that you'll be involved in a horrible nightmare relationship."

== Critical reception ==
On its release as a single, Larry Flick of Billboard described "Choice in the Matter" as a "quirky, instantly contagious cut". He noted the song's "jangly guitars, skittling pop beats, and fuzzy retro-pop texture" as well as Mann's "low-key, emotion-filled vocal attack". Cash Box selected "Choice in the Matter" as their "Pick of the Week" for the week of February 3, 1996. Reviewer Steve Baltin praised it as a "wonderful pop tune" which "combines Liz Phair type hooks with '60s pop grooves".

In a review of I'm with Stupid, Melissa Ruggieri of the Sun-Sentinel commented, "Mann isn't happy with people who have deceived her on 'Choice in the Matter', yet she doesn't lash out with the intensity of an Alanis Morissette, choosing instead to state her gripes in a warm, girlish voice over a chugging drumbeat." Chuck Campbell of the Scripps Howard News Service noted that "when a lover suspiciously ignores phone messages in her presence on the dense sounding 'Choice in the Matter,' she sees the flashing answering machine as a signal of deceit." Shane Danielsen of The Sydney Morning Herald considered songs such as 'Choice in the Matter' to "attest to Mann's melodic skills".

== Track listing ==
CD single

1. "Choice in the Matter" (LP Version) - 3:13

== Personnel ==
Choice in the Matter

- Aimee Mann – lead vocals, backing vocals, guitar
- Jon Brion – guitar, guitar solo, percussion, backing vocals
- Brad Hallen – bass
- John Sands – drums
- Glenn Tilbrook, Chris Difford – backing vocals

Production

- Jon Brion – producer
- Mike Denneen – recording
- Jack Joseph Puig – mixing
- Jonathan Wyner – mastering

== Charts ==
Chart (1996)	Peak position
US Adult Alternative Songs (Billboard)	12
Quebec (ADISQ)	44
