= I Should've Known =

1993 song by Aimee Mann

Single by Aimee Mann

from the album Whatever
- B-side: "Jimmy Hoffa Jokes"
- Released: 1993; 1994 (re-issue)
- Length: 4:00 (single version); 4:53 (album version)
- Label: Imago
- Songwriter: Aimee Mann
- Producer: Jon Brion

Aimee Mann singles chronology
"I Should've Known" (1993)	"Stupid Thing" (1993)

"I Should've Known" is a song by American singer-songwriter Aimee Mann, which was released in 1993 as the lead single from her debut studio album Whatever. The song was written by Mann and produced by Jon Brion. "I Should've Known" reached No. 55 in the UK Singles Chart and No. 16 in the US Billboard Modern Rock Tracks chart. In 1994, the single was reissued in the UK and Europe, and peaked at No. 45 in the UK Singles Chart.

== Background ==
In the United States, "I Should've Known" received airplay on alternative radio, but failed to generate considerable sales. It saw more commercial success in the United Kingdom after being played frequently on BBC Radio. Mann told The Boston Globe in 1993: "When I asked Jonathan Russell [a BBC staffer] why the BBC wanted to play it, he said, 'Just because it's a good song.' Hey, I didn't think that happened anymore."

== Music video ==
The song's music video was shot in and around a vacant house near Ithaca, New York in March 1993. It was directed by Katherine Dieckmann and produced by Sandra Tait for Cascando Studios. Dickermann and Mann had originally intended for the video to be shot "down south" with a "spring feeling" but owing to the 1993 Storm of the Century, which resulted in heavy snowfall, it was filmed near Ithaca instead.

Dieckmann told Billboard in 1993: "It's unusual to see a woman in a video who isn't portrayed as a bimbo or as some 'tough chick'. Aimee wanted to break out of the whole 'Til Tuesday image of the heartbroken, lovesick girl raging about relationships. So we decided to treat this breakup with some black humor."

== Critical reception ==
In a review of Whatever, Mark Caro of the Chicago Tribune described "I Should've Known" as the best of the album's "upbeat songs" and a "crunching guitar stomp freshened by a breeze of background vocals." Chuck Campbell of the Scripps Howard News Service considered it a "liberating song" which is "so well crafted with its thoroughly ingratiating hook, sumptuous backing vocals and intriguing decorations that listeners will be hard pressed to let the album advance to the second track".

Parry Gettelman of The Orlando Sentinel wrote: "'I Should've Known' sounds like Sgt. Pepper-era Beatles via World Party and Crowded House. There's a bit of the Kinks via Chrissie Hynde in Mann's vocal, and the coda is shot through with the riff from George Harrison's 'Something' kinda sideways and upside down." Sam Gnerre of The News-Pilot noted: "Mann breathes life into the often-complex songs with her warm, conversational vocal style, which gives mid-tempo songs such as "I Should've Known" a resonant fullness."

In a review of the song's UK single release, Taylor Parkes of Melody Maker gave a mixed review, calling it "thick in both senses". He considered it "the fattest, most thunderous pop record of this or any other recent week", but also believed there is "more intelligence in a Linus manifesto than this happy, little rip-off" of Bob Dylan's 1973 song "Knockin' on Heaven's Door".

== Track listing ==
=== 1993 release ===
7" single (UK release)

1. "I Should've Known" (Edit) – 4:00
2. "Jimmy Hoffa Jokes" – 2:29

CD single (European release)

1. "I Should've Known" (Edit) – 4:00
2. "Jimmy Hoffa Jokes" – 2:29
3. "Jacob Marley's Chain" – 3:02

CD single (US release)

1. "I Should've Known" – 4:53
2. "Take It Back" – 2:52
3. "Baby Blue" – 3:50

CD single (US promo)

1. "I Should've Known" (Edit) – 4:00
2. "I Should've Known" (Edit) – 4:11
3. "I Should've Known" (LP Version) – 4:53

=== 1994 re-issue ===
7" and cassette single

1. "I Should've Known" (Edit) – 4:00
2. "Truth On My Side" (Demo Version) – 4:20

10" single

1. "I Should've Known" (Live) – 4:04
2. "4th July" (Live) – 3:15
3. "Stupid Thing" (Live) – 4:29
4. "The Other End (Of the Telescope)" (Live) – 4:13

CD single

1. "I Should've Known" (Edit) – 4:00
2. "Fifty Years After the Fair" (Demo Version) – 4:01
3. "Truth On My Side" (Demo Version) – 4:20
4. "Put On Some Speed" (Demo Version) – 4:01

== Personnel ==
I Should've Known

- Aimee Mann – vocals, electric guitar, bass, dixie cup
- Jon Brion – electric guitar, pump organ, mellotron, chamberlin, bass, drums, vocals
- Todd Nelson – intro guitar
- Buddy Judge – vocals

Production

- Jon Brion – producer of "I Should've Known", "Take It Back", "Baby Blue", "Jimmy Hoffa Jokes" and "Jacob Marley's Chain"
- Bob Clearmountain – mixing on "I Should've Known", "Take It Back", "Baby Blue", "Jimmy Hoffa Jokes" and "Jacob Marley's Chain"
- Michael Reiter – assistant mixer on "I Should've Known"
- Bob Ludwig – mastering

Other

- Anton Corbijn – photography
- Anonymous Design – 1994 reissue sleeve design

== Charts ==
Chart (1993)	Peak position
UK Singles (Official Charts)	55
UK Airplay Breakers (Music Week)	7
US Alternative Airplay (Billboard)	16

Chart (1994)	Peak position
UK Singles (Official Charts)	45
UK Airplay Breakers (Music Week)	16
