= Lost in Space (Aimee Mann album) =

Studio album by Aimee Mann
- Released: August 27, 2002
- Studios: Stampede Origin Studios, Sonora Recorders, Henson Recording Studios, Q Division, Kampo
- Genres: Pop, rock
- Length: 43:03
- Labels: V2, SuperEgo
- Producers: Mike Denneen, Ryan Freeland, Michael Lockwood

Aimee Mann chronology
Ultimate Collection (2000)	Lost in Space (2002)	Live at St. Ann's Warehouse (2004)

Singles from Lost in Space
- 1. "Humpty Dumpty" Released: October 14, 2002; 2. "Pavlov's Bell" Released: April 25, 2003

Lost in Space is the fourth album by the American singer-songwriter Aimee Mann, released in 2002 on her own label, SuperEgo Records. A special edition released in 2003 featured a second disc containing live recordings, B-sides and previously unreleased songs.

Mann performed the songs "This Is How It Goes" and "Pavlov's Bell" during a guest appearance on the television show Buffy the Vampire Slayer, in the season seven episode "Sleeper". "Today's the Day" is featured in the 2002 film Enough. The cover and accompanying mini-comic were drawn by the Canadian cartoonist Seth. A remastered reissue was released in 2025, supported with a US anniversary tour.

== Reception ==
Professional ratings
Aggregate scores
Source	Rating
Metacritic	74/100
Review scores
Source	Rating
AllMusic	3/5 stars
Blender	4/5 stars
Chicago Sun-Times	3.5/4 stars
Entertainment Weekly	B+
Orlando Sentinel	4/5 stars
Pitchfork	7.6/10
Q	4/5 stars
Rolling Stone	2/5 stars
Spin	6/10
The Village Voice	C+

Lost in Space holds a score of 74 out of 100 from Metacritic, indicating "generally favorable reviews". E! Online gave it a B+ and wrote, "Mann's cranky muse is consistently compelling, showcasing both her wry lyrics and terrific melodies." Uncut gave the album four stars out of five and called it "textured and complex". Blender also gave it four stars out of five and said the album "pushes [Mann] in a new direction." Q likewise gave it four stars and said that Mann has "returned to writing songs which are wry, funny, adult and perceptive, all wrapped up in handsome melodies." Billboard gave it a positive review and called it "sonically rich" and "home to some of Mann's most intimate storytelling." Neumu.net gave it seven stars out of ten and called it "a rare record that simply responds to the quiet masses who maybe feel just a bit too much too often, and offers them a soothing, downbeat source of comfort without preaching or apology." Mojo gave it a positive review and stated: "Michael Lockwood's production occasionally affects a sound akin to a Vonda Sheppard reared on black dreams and Russian literature."

Other reviews are very average or mixed: Trouser Press gave it an average review and said of Mann, "The songs are not as strong overall as on her previous albums, and the tempo neither flags nor picks up over the course of the album." In his The Village Voice Consumer Guide, Robert Christgau gave it a C+ and said of Mann, "For her fans, the news is that she's invested her profits in studio musicians. Takes talent to make that more boring than solo acoustic, no?" Rolling Stone gave it two stars out of five and said, "The tempos and melodies drag throughout; it's as though we've heard Mann sing these songs before, only here her understated passion comes off more like overstated indifference."

== Release ==
By June 2008, the album had sold 232,000 units in the United States according to Nielsen SoundScan.

On 6 March 2025, Mann announced a remastered reissue of Lost in Space, with a US anniversary tour due to start in June.

== Track listing ==
All songs written by Aimee Mann, unless otherwise noted.

1. "Humpty Dumpty" – 4:01
2. "High on Sunday 51" (Paul Dalen, Mann) – 3:15
3. "Lost in Space" – 3:28
4. "This Is How It Goes" – 3:47
5. "Guys Like Me" – 3:12
6. "Pavlov's Bell" – 4:27
7. "Real Bad News" – 3:53
8. "Invisible Ink" (Mann, Clayton Scoble) – 4:59
9. "Today's the Day" – 4:42
10. "The Moth" – 3:46
11. "It's Not" – 3:27

== Personnel ==
- Aimee Mann – vocals (1–11), acoustic guitar (1,2,4,5,6,8–11), piano (1,5,9), tambourine (1,3–6,9,10), JX3-P (1), bass (1–5,7–11), paddles (2,10), percussion (2), drum fills (2), backing vocals (2), 12-string acoustic guitar (4,9), electric guitar (5), egg shaker (6), SK-1 (7), handclaps (8), drums (10,11)
- Jay Bellerose – drums (7)
- Jebin Bruni – Chamberlin strings (2), piano (2), Prophet 5 (4)
- Denyse Buffum – viola (8,11)
- Darius Campo – violin (8,11)
- Susan Chatman – violin (8,11)
- Larry Corbett – cello (8,11)
- Mike Denneen – harpsichord (3), electric piano (3), Wurlitzer (3)
- Joel Derouin – violin (8,11)
- Jason Falkner – bass (6)
- Ryan Freeland – AM radio loop (7), handclaps (8)
- Armen Garabedian – violin (8,11)
- Berj Garabedian – violin (8,11)
- Buddy Judge – backing vocals (1–4)
- Suzie Katayama – conductor (8,11)
- Peter Kent – violin (8,11)
- Natalie Leggett – violin (8,11)
- Mario de León – violin (8,11)
- Michael Lockwood – JX3-P (1), Leslie organ (1), slide guitar (1,4,8), electric guitar (1–11), Chamberlin (1,3,6,9,10), autoharp (2), soprano zither (2), Dobro (2), SK-1 (2–4,9–11), baritone guitar (2), B-Bender guitar (3), VL-1 (4), VL-5 (4), 12-string guitar (4), ARP Solina (5), MT-520 (5), Prophet 600 (5,9), harmonium (5), Sonora shakers (5,9), SK-5 (6,7,9–11), MT-65 (6), RS-09 (7), MT-52 (7), CZ-1000 (7), Static (7), Theremin (7), Hohner bass 3 (7), space loop (7), handclaps (8), fun machine (8), Nashville guitar (9), paddles (9), celeste (9), loops (9), 12-string guitar (9), MT-65 E-Bow (9), Mini-Moog (9,10), MT-45 (10), acoustic guitar (10), Omnichord (10), Marxophone (10), SA-9 (11), CS-5 (11)
- Seth McClain – handclaps (8)
- Joe Meyer – French horn (11)
- Carole Mukogawa – viola (8,11)
- Dave Palmer – organ (7)
- Michael Penn – drum loop (2)
- Jonathan Quarmby – horn arrangement (11), string arrangement (8,11)
- Mike Randle – backing vocals (3)
- Michele Richards – violin (8,11)
- Steve Richards – cello (8,11)
- Jeff Rothschild (8)
- Rusty Squeezebox – backing vocals (3)
- Darian Sahanaja – backing vocals (1)
- John Sands – drums (1,3–6,8,9), Sonora shakers (1)
- Daniel Smith – cello (8,11)
- David Stone – double bass (8,11)
- Patrick Warren – Chamberlin strings (4), Chamberlin horns (4), Chamberlin (5,6), Marxophone (5)
- John Wittenberg – violin (8,11)
