= Whatever (Aimee Mann album) =

Studio album by Aimee Mann
- Released: May 11, 1993
- Studios: Q Division, Capitol Studios, Clubhouse, Blue Jay, Bearsville, Zeitgeist, Sunset Sound, Presence
- Genres: Pop; rock; alternative rock
- Length: 52:14
- Labels: Imago (original release); Geffen (reissue)
- Producers: Tony Berg; Jon Brion; Michael Hausman; Aimee Mann

Aimee Mann chronology
Whatever (1993)	I'm with Stupid (1995)

Whatever is the first solo album by the American singer-songwriter Aimee Mann, released in 1993. It was produced by Mann, Tony Berg, Michael Hausman and Jon Brion.

Mann recorded Whatever after her previous band, 'Til Tuesday, disbanded. It earned positive reviews but did not meet sales expectations. It was included in the book 1001 Albums You Must Hear Before You Die.

== Background ==
In the 1980s, Mann co-founded the new wave band 'Til Tuesday. They released three albums and disbanded in 1990 when Mann left to pursue a solo career. Mann said later that her musical interests had changed and that she was more interested in "acoustic guitar music".

Michael Hausman, the 'Til Tuesday drummer and Mann's former boyfriend, became her manager. Epic Records did not release Mann from her record contract with 'Til Tuesday for three years, which prevented her from releasing new material. It was the first of several disputes Mann had with record labels, which Hausman said had a lasting effect on her attitude to the music industry.

== Recording ==
Mann recorded Whatever with the producer Jon Brion, a member of the 'Til Tuesday touring band. Mann found working with Brion exciting and felt her songwriting improved with him. She cited English bands such as the Kinks, the Zombies and Squeeze as influences. Mann wrote "I've Had It" about her frustrations with Epic when they would not release her from her record contract, and said it was influenced by Simon & Garfunkel. In an interview in 2018, Mann said she felt "4th of July" was the album's best song.

== Reception ==
Professional ratings
Review scores
Source	Rating
AllMusic	4.5/5 stars
The Buffalo News	3.5/5 stars
Chicago Tribune	3/4 stars
The Encyclopedia of Popular Music	5/5 stars
Entertainment Weekly	A
Los Angeles Times	3.5/4 stars
Orlando Sentinel	4/5 stars
Q	4/5 stars
Rolling Stone	3/5 stars
The Rolling Stone Album Guide	4/5 stars

Whatever was released in 1993 on the independent label Imago. It earned positive reviews but did not meet sales expectations. As of February 2001, Whatever had sold 170,000 copies in US.

Entertainment Weekly praised the "hooky songs" and "evocative lyrics". The Los Angeles Times wrote that Mann "mixes words like a master, catching lifetimes of ache and Angst", and the Chicago Tribune compared her to Elvis Costello. Rolling Stone cited the melodies as "sunny, surreal" and the lyrics as "razor-sharp". The Independent's Andy Gill highly recommended the album, concluding that "it's the tension between Mann's disarmingly direct, conversational lyric style and the complexity of her musical design that gives Whatever its peculiar charge". In The Village Voice, Robert Christgau cited "Mr. Harris" as a "choice cut".

In 2000, Elvis Costello included Whatever in his list of 500 greatest albums for Vanity Fair. It was included in the book 1001 Albums You Must Hear Before You Die and in Pitchfork's 2022 list of the 150 best albums of the 1990s. In 2003, the English writer Nick Hornby included "I've Had It" in Songbook, a list of songs that changed his life.

== Track listing ==
All songs written by Aimee Mann, except where noted.
No.	Title	Writer(s)	Length
1.	"I Should've Known"		4:53
2.	"Fifty Years After the Fair"		3:46
3.	"4th of July"		3:21
4.	"Could've Been Anyone"		4:23
5.	"Put Me on Top"		3:28
6.	"Stupid Thing"	Mann, Jon Brion	4:27
7.	"Say Anything"	Mann, Jon Brion	4:57
8.	"Jacob Marley's Chain"		3:01
9.	"Mr. Harris"		4:05
10.	"I Could Hurt You Now"		4:17
11.	"I Know There's a Word"	Mann, Jon Brion	3:16
12.	"I've Had It"		4:42
13.	"Way Back When"		4:05
14.	"Nothing"		0:09
Total length:			52:50

== Personnel ==
- Aimee Mann – vocals (all songs), electric guitar (1), bass (1–3, 5, 6, 10, 11), Dixie cup (1), acoustic guitar (3, 13), pump organ (4), Mellotron (5), percussion (7), lo-fi acoustic guitar (10), nylon-string guitar (12)
- Michael Hausman – drums (3, 10, 13), percussion (4), orchestral percussion (8), bass drum (12), tongue drum (12), congas (12), cymbals (12)
- Jim Keltner – drums (2, 5, 6)
- Milt Sutton – drums (7)
- Jon Brion – drums (1, 4, 11), bass (1, 4, 7, 13), electric guitar (1, 2, 5–7, 10, 12, 13), pump organ (1, 6, 8), Mellotron (1, 3, 4, 5, 7, 8, 10), Chamberlin (1, 4, 6, 8), vocals (1, 2, 4, 5, 7, 10, 13), Optigan (2, 4, 6, 12, 13), glockenspiel (2, 4, 10), tambourine (2, 10), vibraphone (3, 4), guitar (4), piano (4, 6, 7, 9, 10, 12, 13), harmonium (6, 8), acoustic guitar (7), acoustic bass (8), kazoo (8), woodwind arrangement (9), Hammond organ (10, 13), Indian harmonium (10), bass harmonica (10, 12), keyboards (11), cottage organ (12), B-3 organ (12), Wurlitzer organ (12), celesta (12), tack piano (12), piccolo flute (12), bottles (12), turtle guitar (13), toy piano (13), marimba (13), pipes (13)
- Buddy Judge – vocals (1, 10–13), acoustic guitar (5, 6, 8, 11, 13), hi-fi acoustic guitar (10), bottles (12), pipes (13)
- Todd Nelson – intro guitar (1)
- Randy Brion – euphonium (9), trombone (13)
- Mike Breaux – oboe (9), bassoon (12)
- Roger McGuinn – 12-string electric guitar (2), vocals (2)
- David Coleman – electric cello (10)
- The Sid Sharp Strings – Sid Sharp (9, 11), Joy Lyle (9, 11), Harry Shirinian (9, 11), Harry Shultz (9, 11)
- Jimmie Haskell – string arrangement (9)

== Chart positions ==
Chart (1993)	Peak position
UK Albums (Official Charts)	39
US Billboard 200	127

=== Singles ===
Year	Single	Chart	Position
1993	"I Should've Known"	Modern Rock Tracks	16
