= Long Shot (Aimee Mann song) =

1996 song by Aimee Mann

Single by Aimee Mann

from the album I'm with Stupid
- Released: 1996
- Length: 3:15
- Label: Geffen
- Songwriter(s): Aimee Mann
- Producer(s): Jon Brion

Aimee Mann singles chronology
| "Choice in the Matter" (1996) | "Long Shot" (1996) | "You Could Make a Killing" (1996) |

"Long Shot" is a song by American singer-songwriter Aimee Mann, which was released in 1996 as the third single from her second studio album I'm with Stupid. The song was written by Mann and produced by Jon Brion. "Long Shot" peaked at No. 126 in the UK Singles Chart.

== Critical reception ==
In a review of I'm with Stupid, Melissa Ruggieri of the Sun-Sentinel noted the song "cruise[s] along with Beatle-esque harmonies and [a] simple riff". Dave Younk of the St. Cloud Times commented: "Too bad the lyrics on 'Long Shot' most likely will prohibit its radio release, because it is perfectly entrancing. The gritty guitar chord that drives the song provides the perfect backdrop to Mann's warm voice."

Chuck Campbell of the Scripps Howard News Service described the song as "shuffling" with lyrics showing "Mann realizes she's been sucked in by a manipulator". Joe Konz of The Indianapolis Star considered the song both a "rocker" and "blistering epithet at manipulative types". Stephen Thomas Erlewine of Allmusic noted the "rolling hip-hop-derived beat" and "nonchalant profanity".

== Track listing ==
CD single (European and Australian release)

1. "Long Shot" (LP Version) – 3:15
2. "You're with Stupid Now" (LP Version) – 3:29
3. "Driving with One Hand on the Wheel" (Previously Unreleased) – 2:43

CD single (UK release)

1. "Long Shot" (LP Version) – 3:15
2. "You're with Stupid Now" (LP Version) – 3:29
3. "That's Just What You Are" (Acoustic Version) – 4:19
4. "Driving with One Hand on the Wheel" (Previously Unreleased) – 2:43

CD single (UK promo)

1. "Long Shot" (Radio Edit) – 3:13

== Personnel ==
Long Shot

- Aimee Mann – lead vocals, guitar, guitar solo, bass
- Stacy Jones, John Sands – drums
- Michael Lockwood – guitar
- Jon Brion – guitar, percussion, backing vocals
- Clayton Scoble – backing vocals

Production

- Jon Brion – producer (all tracks), mixing on "You're with Stupid Now"
- Mike Denneen – recording
- Jack Joseph Puig – mixing on "Long Shot"
- Robert Read – mixing on "You're with Stupid Now"
- Jonathan Wyner – mastering

Other

- Francesca Restrepo, Aimee Mann – art direction, design
- Kate Garner – photography

== Charts ==
Chart performance for "Long Shot"
| Chart (1996) | Peak position |
|---|---|
| Australia (ARIA) | 86 |
| UK Singles (OCC) | 126 |
