= Save Me (Aimee Mann song) =

1999 song

Single by Aimee Mann

from the album Magnolia: Music from the Motion Picture
- Released: 1999
- Genre: Contemporary folk
- Length: 4:35
- Label: Reprise
- Songwriter: Aimee Mann
- Producer: Aimee Mann

"Save Me" is a song by the American singer-songwriter Aimee Mann, written for the 1999 film Magnolia. It was nominated for an Academy Award for Best Original Song and a Grammy Award for Best Female Pop Vocal Performance. It was released on the Magnolia soundtrack.

== Writing ==
The actor and comedian Dave Foley said Mann wrote "Save Me" about him while they were in a relationship. Foley said he was "the only man Aimee's written a positive song about", and that "to have this song written was such a balm to my soul at that point".

== Reception ==
Mann performed "Save Me" at the 72nd Academy Awards, where it was nominated for an Academy Award for Best Original Song. It lost to "You'll Be in My Heart" by Phil Collins, from the animated Disney film Tarzan. "Save Me" was also nominated for a Grammy Award for Best Female Pop Vocal Performance. Mann later said it "really gave a blood transfusion to my career. But it wasn't like I went from playing to five people to 5,000 people. It was just a real influx of energy."

Reviewing a Mann performance in 2013, the Guardian Ian Gittins wrote that "'Save Me' remains a piquant delight that is worthy of Joni Mitchell in her prime". In 2022, Pitchfork named "Save Me" the 193rd-best song of the 1990s. The Pitchfork critic Eric Torres wrote: "Subtly informed by a long period of disappointment, 'Save Me' is wry but surefooted ... The featherlight production and songwriting belie its inevitable punch: here, Mann underscores the raw tenderness that comes with searching for help."

== Music video ==
The music video, shot during the filming of Magnolia, was directed by the Magnolia director, Paul Thomas Anderson, and uses many of the actors, including Julianne Moore, Philip Seymour Hoffman, Tom Cruise, William H. Macy, and John C. Reilly. The video inserts Mann into various scenes from the film as she performs the song. The video uses no digital manipulation; the scenes were shot at the end of filming days with Mann and actors who were asked to stay in place.
