= 'Til Tuesday =

American new wave band

- Origin: Boston, Massachusetts, U.S.
- Genres: New wave; pop; pop rock; alternative rock
- Years active: 1982–1990; 2025
- Label: Epic
- Members: Aimee Mann; Robert Holmes; Joey Pesce; Michael Hausman
- Past members: Jon Brion; Michael Montes

'Til Tuesday was an American new wave band formed in Boston, Massachusetts, United States. The band, consisting of Aimee Mann (lead vocals, bass), Robert Holmes (guitar), Joey Pesce (keyboards), and Michael Hausman (drums), was active from 1982 to 1989. They are best known for their 1985 hit single "Voices Carry". 'Til Tuesday disbanded in 1990 when Mann left to begin a solo career.

== History ==
'Til Tuesday first gained fame six months after its formation when it won Boston's WBCN Rock & Roll Rumble in 1983. Their original composition "Love in a Vacuum" (credited to all members of the group) received a fair amount of airplay on the station, and the group was eventually signed to Epic Records.

"Love in a Vacuum" was re-recorded for the Epic debut album, 1985's Voices Carry; however, the title track became their breakthrough song. The "Voices Carry" single peaked at number eight on the U.S. Billboard Hot 100, and is said to have been inspired by an argument between Mann and Hausman, who had broken off a relationship before the album's release. According to producer Mike Thorne on his Stereo Society web site, "The title track was originally written and sung by Aimee as if to a woman.... The record company was predictably unhappy with such lyrics."

The band became an early MTV staple with the "Voices Carry" video, which depicts a domineering boyfriend trying to convert Mann to his upper-class lifestyle; she finally lashes out at him during a concert, standing up from her seat in the audience and removing her cap to reveal her signature spiky, rat-tailed hair. The group won that year's MTV Video Music Award for Best New Artist.

By the 1986 follow-up Welcome Home, Mann was beginning to write more of the songs herself and the band was moving away from the slick new wave sound of their debut. But while critical reaction was generally strong, the #26 placement for the lead single, "What About Love", was a commercial disappointment, especially after the top-ten success of "Voices Carry". The album entered the U.S. top 50, also a letdown after the #19 placing for their debut.

After the album's release Pesce left the band and was replaced by Michael Montes. At about the same time, Mann's two-year relationship with singer-songwriter Jules Shear, whom she had been dating since the release of the Voices Carry album, came to an end. This breakup informed the band's final album, 1988's Everything's Different Now, particularly in the song "J for Jules", though Mann insisted that not every song on the LP was about the relationship. Shear collaborated with Matthew Sweet on the album's title track; it also featured "The Other End (of the Telescope)", a collaboration between Mann and Elvis Costello on which Costello provided a guest vocal. Holmes and Montes played on every track, but Holmes left before its release; for live dates, Til Tuesday was now a duo of Mann and Hausman, supported by session musicians.

While critical praise continued to flow, Everything's Different Now album peaked at No. 124 in the U.S., while the lead single "(Believed You Were) Lucky" (co-written with Shear) reached number 95. 'Til Tuesday broke up in 1990 when Mann left to start her solo career. She said later that her musical interests had changed, and that she was more interested in "acoustic guitar music" than new wave pop. Hausman, her former boyfriend, became her manager. In 2025, Mann said: "To be honest, I was the weakest link. My vocals were super high and kind of weird and sort of punky ... I'm surprised we ever got a record deal. But it's an era where we were right in the wave of a certain sound at a certain time, and I think we did that really well for a while."

On May 17, 2025, 'Til Tuesday reunited to perform at the Cruel World Festival in Pasadena. It was their first show in 33 years, and the first with the original lineup of Mann, Holmes, Pesce and Hausman in 35 years. They performed songs from all three of their albums, plus a cover of the 1984 single "Drive" by the Cars. Mann said she enjoyed the challenge of preparing for the performance, and had to relearn how to sing the songs, as her voice and style had changed.

== Personnel ==
- Aimee Mann – lead vocals, bass guitar, acoustic guitar (1982–1989, 2025)
- Robert Holmes – guitar, backing vocals (1982–1989, 2025)
- Joey Pesce – keyboards, synthesizer, piano, backing vocals (1982–1987, 2025)
- Michael Hausman – drums, percussion (1982–1989, 2025)
- Michael Montes – keyboards (1987–1989)

=== Touring members ===
- Jon Brion – guitar, bass guitar
- Clayton Scoble – guitar
- Dave Darby – bass guitar

== Discography ==
=== Studio albums ===
Title	Album details	Peak chart positions			Certifications
Title	Album details	US	AUS	CAN	Certifications
Voices Carry	Released: 1985; Label: Epic	19	81	29	RIAA: Gold; MC: Gold
Welcome Home	Released: 1986; Label: Epic	49	—	65	RIAA: Gold
Everything's Different Now	Released: 1988; Label: Epic	124	—	—	

=== Compilation albums ===
- Coming Up Close: A Retrospective (1996, Epic)

=== Singles ===
Title	Year	Peak chart positions			Album
Title	Year	US	AUS	CAN	Album
"Voices Carry"	1985	8	15	15	Voices Carry
"Looking Over My Shoulder"	1985	61	—	—	Voices Carry
"Love in a Vacuum"	1985	—	—	—	Voices Carry
"What About Love"	1986	26	92	55	Welcome Home
"Coming Up Close"	1986	59	—	—	Welcome Home
"(Believed You Were) Lucky"	1989	95	—	—	Everything's Different Now
"Rip in Heaven"	1989	—	—	—	Everything's Different Now
"Everything's Different Now"	1989	—	—	—	Everything's Different Now
