= I'm with Stupid (album) =

Studio album by Aimee Mann
- Released: November 1995
- Genre: Pop rock
- Length: 56:21
- Label: Geffen
- Producer: Jon Brion

Aimee Mann chronology
| Whatever (1993) | I'm with Stupid (1995) | Magnolia (1999) |

Professional ratings
Review scores
| Source | Rating |
|---|---|
| AllMusic | 3.5/5 stars |
| Chicago Tribune | 3/4 stars |
| Christgau's Consumer Guide | (neither) |
| Entertainment Weekly | A |
| Los Angeles Times | 3/4 stars |
| Orlando Sentinel | 5/5 stars |
| Q | 3/5 stars |
| The Rolling Stone Album Guide | 3/5 stars |
| Spin | 7/10 |
| USA Today | 3/4 stars |

I'm with Stupid is the second studio album by the American singer-songwriter Aimee Mann, released in 1995. It was produced by Jon Brion, who also produced Mann's debut, Whatever (1993). The song "You're with Stupid Now" was inspired by Mann's friend Tony Banks, a British politician.

== Release ==
After Mann finished I'm with Stupid, her record company, Imago, encountered financial problems and delayed its release. Imago eventually sold it to Geffen, which signed Mann in 1994 and released I'm with Stupid in 1995.

Like Whatever, I'm with Stupid received positive reviews but failed to meet sales expectations. As of February 2001, it had sold 123,000 copies in the United States.

== Track listing ==
All tracks by Aimee Mann, except where noted.
| No. | Title | Writer(s) | Length |
|---|---|---|---|
| 1. | "Long Shot" | | 3:13 |
| 2. | "Choice in the Matter" | Jon Brion, Mann | 3:13 |
| 3. | "Sugarcoated" | Butler, Mann | 3:39 |
| 4. | "You Could Make a Killing" | | 3:21 |
| 5. | "Superball" | | 3:05 |
| 6. | "Amateur" | Brion, Mann | 4:51 |
| 7. | "All Over Now" | | 3:37 |
| 8. | "Par for the Course" | | 6:01 |
| 9. | "You're with Stupid Now" | | 3:27 |
| 10. | "That's Just What You Are" | Brion, Mann | 4:22 |
| 11. | "Frankenstein" | Brion, Mann | 4:25 |
| 12. | "Ray" | | 4:47 |
| 13. | "It's Not Safe" | | 5:02 |
| 14. | "[silence]" (hidden track pregap) | | 0:52 |
| 15. | "[hidden track]" | | 1:20 |
| Total length: | | | 51:15 |

== Personnel ==
- Aimee Mann – vocals (1–13), bass (1,3,4,5,8,10,12), guitar (1,2,5,8,13), backing vocals (2,3,10), acoustic guitar (4,9,10,12), electric guitar (4,7,10), handclaps (5), drums (8), keyboards (8), percussion (8,9)
- Jon Brion – guitar (1,6,13), percussion (1,2,7,13), backing vocals (1,2,3,7,9,13), drums (3,4,11,12), keyboards (3,6,11,13), lead guitar (4), bass harmonica (5), handclaps (5), bass (6,7,11,13), acoustic guitar (7,11), electric guitar (7,9), acoustic bass (9), cello (9), distorted nylon guitar (11), tack piano (12), harmonium (12)
- Bernard Butler – guitar (3), keyboards (3), electric guitar (7)
- Mike Denneen – keyboards (5,10)
- Chris Difford – backing vocals (2,10,11)
- Brad Hallan – bass (2)
- Juliana Hatfield – backing vocals (4,6)
- Neil Innes – backing vocals (13)
- Stacy Jones – drums (1,7)
- Michael Lockwood – guitar (1)
- Jon Lupfer – handclaps (5)
- Michael Penn – guitar (13)
- John Sands – drums (1,2,5,13), guitar (2)
- Clayton Scoble – backing vocals (1,12,13), electric guitar (10), guitar (13)
- Glenn Tilbrook – backing vocals (2,10,11,13), electric guitar (10)
- Martyn Watson – drum loop stuff (10)

Technical

- Joseph Jack Puig – mixing
- Mike Denneen – mixing
- Rob Jaczko – mixing
- Jonathan Wyner – mastering

== Chart positions ==
| Chart (1995) | Peak position |
|---|---|
| Australian Albums (ARIA) | 105 |
| Canada Top Albums/CDs (RPM) | 71 |
| Scottish Albums (Official Charts) | 89 |
| UK Albums (Official Charts) | 51 |
| US Billboard 200 | 82 |

=== Singles ===
| Year | Single | Chart | Position | Ref |
|---|---|---|---|---|
| 1995 | "That's Just What You Are" | Modern Rock Tracks | 24 | |
| 1995 | "That's Just What You Are" | The Billboard Hot 100 | 93 | |
