= Robert Holmes (musician) =

American musician

Robert Holmes (born March 31, 1959) is an English-born guitarist, best known for his work as guitarist/vocalist/writer in the American new wave band 'Til Tuesday, the former band of Aimee Mann. He first moved to America with his family at the age of seven.

== From 'til Tuesday to Ultra Blue ==
In 1988, he formed a bluesy rock quartet called Ultra Blue with his wife Glenda who sang backups for Robert and occasionally sang lead. Ultra Blue won best new artist at the Boston Music Awards in 1989 and made many recordings. Several sessions were paid for by Epic records but a recording contract never materialized.

In 1993, Ultra Blue was put on the back burner when Holmes joined up with Street Magic, an a cappella quintet specializing in Doo Wop. A short article written by Holmes was published on the backside page of the August 1996 Musician magazine called "The Morning After 'Til Tuesday" in which Holmes detailed some of the differences between working with 'Til Tuesday and doing general business work on a local level with Street Magic.

In 1996, he moved to Vermont and formed a function/cover band called "Love Bomb" for which he was the leader and lead guitarist. According to an interview he gave to the Valley Advocate, the band inherited its name from the Lynsey De Paul song "Love Bomb". The band built up a sizable following in the Southern Vermont/ Western Massachusetts area and played numerous weddings and private parties for the next 13 years.

In 2010, Holmes collaborated with Grammy Award-winning producer Bob St. John and former Beat Surender (Sony Records) front man Paul Souza to release Shakin' Not Stirred under Souza's current rock band The Velveteen Playboys, before moving to the UK.

== Back to the UK ==
Holmes is now a freelance guitar player for hire living in the UK.

During late 2011 and spring 2012, Holmes played guitar on the first Wilderspin album Something to Crow About, with songs written by Mark Wilderspin and produced/engineered by Paul Bryant.

Late 2012 sees Holmes again working with producer and bass player Paul Bryant, on the Sarana VerLin and Billy Brandt CD Going Home.

Both Wilderspin and VerLin Brandt albums recorded in Paul Bryant's Cotswold recording studio in the UK.

In 2013, Holmes played on a session with Hugh Padgham producing at British Grove studios in London. The two tracks recorded were written by Holmes and singer-songwriter Lydia Baylis, but they have not been released as of yet. There are also original and cover songs recorded by Holmes at home posted on his SoundCloud page.

In 2017, Holmes joined The Achievers, a touring original Rhythm and Blues act and winners of the sixth UK Blues Challenge in 2019. The band has released two records, Live at the SVA in 2018 and The Lost Arc in 2019.

== Personal life ==
He lives in Gloucestershire with his wife, artist Sheridan Jones.
