= Mike Thorne =

English musician and producer (born 1948)

- Born: 25 January 1948 (age 78); Sunderland, County Durham, England
- Genres: Rock; punk rock; post-punk; jazz fusion; pop
- Occupations: Record producer; arranger; composer; engineer; musician; mixer
- Instruments: Keyboards; synthesizer; percussion

Mike Thorne (born 25 January 1948) is an English record producer, arranger, composer, engineer, and musician. He started playing the piano at the age of 10. After studying physics at Hertford College, Oxford, in the late 1960s he worked as a tape operator in London with Deep Purple and many others. Later he worked as a music journalist, A&R man and in the late 1970s he became a record producer.

As a record producer, Thorne has worked on albums by artists of various genres of rock, including punk, post-punk, jazz fusion and also pop. He has produced for artists including Roger Daltrey, John Cale, Bronski Beat, Soft Cell, Nina Hagen, Laurie Anderson, the Reds, and Soft Machine.

His more notable productions include the seminal first three records by Wire: Pink Flag, Chairs Missing and 154; and Soft Cell's cover version of "Tainted Love" (which was a UK number 1 single for two weeks and sold 1.35m copies in the UK). He also contributed to Michael Tippett's opera New Year, providing electronic elements for the music.
