= Michael Hausman =

American musician

Michael Hausman is an American musician and talent manager, known for his collaboration with former-girlfriend and bandmate Aimee Mann.

Hausman attended Berklee College of Music and played with a Boston band called The Dark before becoming the drummer for the new wave band 'Til Tuesday in the mid-1980s; the group's best-known hit, "Voices Carry" is said to have been inspired by an argument between Hausman and bandmate (and one-time girlfriend) Aimee Mann. The producer of the song, Mike Thorne, disputed this and stated that the lyrics originally had Mann singing to another woman, though the sex was changed owing to pressure from the record label.

Hausman later became a talent manager, representing Mann and other artists, including Michael Penn, Skeleton Key and Pete Droge. In addition to Mann, his current roster includes Suzanne Vega, Marc Cohn, Amanda Palmer, Kristina Train, The Both, and Christina Courtin. Hausman, along with Mann and Penn, founded the independent music collective United Musicians, which is based on the principle that every artist should be able to retain copyright ownership of the work he or she has created.
