= The Both (album) =

Studio album by The Both
- Released: April 15, 2014
- Length: 41:59
- Producer: Paul Bryan

The Both is the 2014 self-titled debut album from the indie rock duo The Both, composed of Aimee Mann and Ted Leo.

Mann and Leo announced in 2013 that they would be releasing an EP together, but after writing enough material for an EP, they decided to continue the collaboration and release a full album. On April 15, 2014, the Both released their debut album, The Both, on Mann's label, SuperEgo Records.

The songs were written by a cross-country exchange of notes, taking "stems of an idea and kick[ing] them back and forth," according to Leo. As Mann described the songwriting process to Billboard, there were "some songs where each person has their verse, the chorus may be written by one person, the bridge written by the other, but there are definitely songs where we would go over line-by-line or just ask each other questions" to "focus the narrative."

The first co-written song, "You Can't Help Me Now," was started by Leo, who described himself as "shaken" when he received Mann's initial notes on the song, because "a person who I respect so much is handing me negative notes about something I wrote. It was really just my own quaking ego.... But we got past that pretty quickly." Leo described the partnership with Mann as "figuratively the best thing that has happened to my writing process in my life."

According to Mann, the song "Bedtime Stories" was written about Scott Miller, as an expression of mourning and as "a musical salute ... consciously a tribute to him, especially the chord progression of the chorus, which is very, very Loud Family."

The album was produced by Paul Bryan, a member of Mann's band, and was recorded in Los Angeles throughout 2013. Bryan also is credited as a performer on the album.

== Critical reception ==
Professional ratings
Aggregate scores
Source	Rating
Metacritic	79/100
Review scores
Source	Rating
AllMusic	4/5 stars
Rolling Stone	3.5/5 stars
Spin	7/10

Billboard called the album "a synthesis and meeting-in-the-middle of Leo and Mann's sonic signatures", resulting in a "warm, intimate and often exuberant piece of work."

The collaboration was well-received, with NPR's Stephen Thompson writing that "each singer sounds freshened and energized — never diminished." The A.V. Club wrote, "Even as Mann pushes toward friendly pop-rock and Leo pulls toward spiky punkiness, the lack of struggle in that mild tension makes for a charm offensive that's hard to resist." The Boston Globe cited "hand-in-glove harmonies" as the album's strongest point, with Mann's "mesmerizing, chalky murmur" giving a "warmly blurry edge" to Leo, while Leo's brashness helped "rough up her style."

Spin called the album "the best thing either artist has ever done," and a "pleasant late-career surprise from an auteur who needed more power and a rocker who needed more pop." In a previous article, Spin cited the song "Milwaukee" as both "brainy and leanly catchy, with a peppy chorus" and a "rollicking, raise-your-beers guitar solo."

== Track listing ==
All tracks are written by the Both, except "Honesty Is No Excuse" written by Phil Lynott.

The Both track listing
No.	Title	Length
1.	"The Gambler"	3:08
2.	"Milwaukee"	4:21
3.	"No Sir"	3:46
4.	"Volunteers of America"	3:44
5.	"Pay for It"	3:16
6.	"You Can't Help Me Now"	3:39
7.	"The Prisoner"	4:41
8.	"Hummingbird"	4:04
9.	"Honesty Is No Excuse"	3:28
10.	"Bedtime Stories"	4:05
11.	"The Inevitable Shove"	3:50

The Barnes & Noble release of the album has two bonus tracks: acoustic versions of "Milwaukee" and "No Sir".

== Music videos ==
During the week prior to the release of the album, SuperEgo Records released a music video of "Milwaukee," by director Daniel Ralston. The video featured Leo as both himself and his fictional uncle Ed Leo, supposedly a former drummer for Adrenalin O.D., providing a comical clash of styles while touring as drummer for the Both. Later in 2014, the SuperEgo label released a music video for "Volunteers of America," also directed by Ralston and featuring Ed Leo.

== Chart performance ==
The Both debuted on the Billboard 200 at No. 59, and on the Billboard Independent Albums chart at No. 12.

Chart (2014)	Peak position
US Billboard 200	59
US Top Rock Albums (Billboard)	15
US Independent Albums (Billboard)	12
US Top Alternative Albums (Billboard)	12
