= Fucking Smilers =

2008 studio album by Aimee Mann

@#%&*! Smilers

Studio album by Aimee Mann
- Released: June 2, 2008
- Recorded: The Sound Factory, Hollywood, California
- Genre: Pop rock
- Length: 45:51
- Label: SuperEgo
- Producer: Paul Bryan

Aimee Mann chronology
One More Drifter in the Snow (2006)	@#%&*! Smilers (2008)	Charmer (2012)

Singles from @#%&*! Smilers
- 1. "31 Today" Released: 2007; 2. "Freeway" Released: May 20, 2008; 3. "Phoenix" Released: 2008

@#%&*! Smilers (pronounced Fucking Smilers) is the seventh studio album by the American singer-songwriter Aimee Mann. It was released by SuperEgo Records in the UK on June 2, 2008, and in the US on June 3. It was produced by Mann's bassist, Paul Bryan, and features the singer-songwriter Sean Hayes, who duets with Mann on the track "Ballantines", and the author Dave Eggers, who whistles on "Little Tornado".

The title of the album comes from an online conversation Mann read in which someone complained about the "fucking smilers" who would approach him at work when he was in a bad mood and try to cheer him up.

== Release ==
In addition to the standard CD package, Smilers is available in a limited-edition package with a book-bound cover, a die-cut 32-page book with illustrations by renowned artist Gary Taxali, and held together with metal screw binding. On December 3, 2008, it was announced that this limited-edition package was nominated for a Grammy in the category of "Best Boxed Or Special Limited Edition Package". The music video for "31 Today", directed by Bobcat Goldthwait, features the comedian Morgan Murphy.

== Reception ==
Professional ratings
Aggregate scores
Source	Rating
Metacritic	(79/100)
Review scores
Source	Rating
Allmusic	4/5 stars
The A.V. Club	B−
Billboard	(favorable)
Entertainment Weekly	B+
Mojo	5/5 stars
Okayplayer	(85/100)
PopMatters	(6/10)
Rolling Stone	3.5/5 stars
Spin	(8/10)
Tiny Mix Tapes	3.5/5 stars

The album has a score of 79 out of 100 from Metacritic based on "generally favorable reviews". Prefix Magazine gave the album a score of 8.5 out of ten and said it "proves Aimee Mann still has plenty to offer doing the same thing she's already been doing for the last fifteen years." Q gave it four stars out of five and said of Mann, "It isn't any different to where she's been before, it's simply that quality levels remain uniformly high." Paste gave it a score of eight out of ten and called it "a more keyboard-centric entry into [Mann's] consistently excellent solo catalog." The Boston Globe gave it a favorable review and said that the pep "is paired with tunes that seep into your brain with the stealth of Mann's own beguiling murmur and lyrics that range from poetic to narrative." Hartford Courant also gave it a favorable review and said that "the strong songwriting and astute musical arrangements combine to make Mann's latest her best album so far." Blender gave it a score of three-and-a-half stars out of five and said, "With its stories of faithless lovers, broken relationships and speed-dealing suburban doctors, @#%&*! Smilers almost seems to feed off the stagnation." Other reviews are average: Uncut gave the album a score of three stars out of five and said that Mann's decision "to forgo electric guitars ... results in the aural equivalent of watercolour washes, lovely and tasteful but lacking presence." Slant Magazine also gave it three stars out of five and said that "[Mann's] wise, bitter lyrics never let her listeners off the hook; it'd be nice to hear her challenge herself as well."

== Track listing ==
All songs written by Aimee Mann, except where noted.

1. "Freeway" – 3:50
2. "Stranger into Starman" – 1:31
3. "Looking for Nothing" – 3:46
4. "Phoenix" – 3:56
5. "Borrowing Time" – 3:12
6. "It's Over" – 3:58
7. "31 Today" – 4:52
8. "The Great Beyond" – 3:12
9. "Medicine Wheel" (Mann, Gretchen Seichrist) – 4:08
10. "Columbus Avenue" – 4:06
11. "Little Tornado" – 3:23
12. "True Believer" (Mann, Grant-Lee Phillips) – 3:32
13. "Ballantines" – 2:21

== Personnel ==
- Aimee Mann – lead vocals, acoustic guitar, bowed acoustic
- Paul Bryan – bass, backing vocals, horn arrangements
- Jay Bellerose – drums
- Jamie Edwards – keyboards
- Buddy Judge – backing vocals on "Looking for Nothing" and "31 Today"
- Kimon Kirk – backing vocals on "It's Over"
- Jebin Bruni – Moog on "Borrowing Time"
- Chris Bruce – guitar solo (arranged for horns) on "Borrowing Time"
- Sean Hayes – duet vocals on "Ballantines"
- Dave Eggers – whistling on "Little Tornado"
- Patrick Warren – string arrangements
- Willie Murillo – trumpet
- Mark Visher – tenor and baritone saxophone
- Jason Thor – trombone and bass trombone
- Eric Gorfain, Daphne Chen, Amy Wickman, Alyssa Park, Terry Glenny, Marisa Kuney, Melisa Reiner – violins
- Leah Katz, Caroline Buckman, David Sage – violas
- Richard Dodd, Alan Matthews, John Krovaza – cellos

== Charts ==
Chart	Peak position
US Billboard 200	32
US Independent Albums	2
