= Mental Illness (album) =

Studio album by Aimee Mann
- Released: March 31, 2017
- Genre: Folk
- Length: 38:29
- Label: SuperEgo
- Producer: Paul Bryan

Aimee Mann chronology
Charmer (2012)	Mental Illness (2017)	Queens of the Summer Hotel (2021)

Singles from Mental Illness
- 1. "Goose Snow Cone" Released: January 17, 2017; 2. "Patient Zero" Released: March 8, 2017

Mental Illness is the ninth studio album by the American singer-songwriter Aimee Mann, released on March 31, 2017 by SuperEgo Records. Mann described it as her "saddest, slowest and most acoustic" album. It won the 2018 Grammy Award for Best Folk Album.

== Recording ==
The album title was suggested by a friend; Mann said it was a "bald, accurate and funny" description of her songwriting themes. "Goose Snow Cone" was inspired by a photo of a friend's cat Mann received while on tour in Ireland. "Patient Zero" was written following a meeting Mann and her husband, Michael Penn, had with the actor Andrew Garfield, who had recently arrived in Hollywood. Mann said Garfield was "obviously kind of freaked out about the vibe of being in that rarefied movie star atmosphere ... So I wrote a song inspired by that."

The album features contributions by Ted Leo, who collaborated with Mann on their project the Both. Jonathan Coulton co-wrote "Patient Zero", "Good For Me" and "Rollercoasters", while John Roderick of the Long Winters cowrote "Poor Judge".

The bulk of the album was recorded on Mann's label, SuperEgo Records, by producer Paul Bryan at Mayberry PCH recording studio. The string arrangements were arranged and conducted by Bryan and recorded separately at United Recordings Los Angeles by Ryan Freeland.

Mann said her manager had pressured her to create more uptempo music, but she resisted, explaining, "Because emotional honesty is uplifting, and it doesn't really matter what the emotion is. It's just uplifting, so that's how I approach it. Writing these songs is never depressing for me, and I don't think you can write out of a position of depression anyway."

== Release ==
The first single from the album, "Goose Snow Cone", was released on January 17, 2017. On March 27, 2017, Mann performed the song on The Late Show with Stephen Colbert. "Patient Zero" was released on March 8, 2017. The music video features actors Bradley Whitford, Tim Heidecker and James Urbaniak. The cover artwork was created by Andrea Dezsö.

== Critical reception ==
Professional ratings
Aggregate scores
Source	Rating
AnyDecentMusic?	7.9/10
Metacritic	84/100
Review scores
Source	Rating
AllMusic	4/5 stars
Chicago Tribune	3/4 stars
Consequence of Sound	A−
The Independent	3/5 stars
The Irish Times	5/5 stars
Mojo	4/5 stars
Pitchfork	7.8/10
Q	4/5 stars
Record Collector	4/5 stars
Uncut	9/10

As opposed to her previous album, Charmer, which was defined as a "solid, punchy pop rock" album, Mental Illness consists of acoustic guitars, strings and percussion. Ryan Bray from Consequence of Sound defined it as the musical "equivalent of washing your mouth out with soap" and stated that it "smacks of cold reality".

Ryan Reed from Rolling Stone magazine described it as "sad and folky". Katie Rife from The A.V. Club pointed out that Mental Illness is a continuation of Aimee Mann's historic tradition of chronicling life's disappointments, both simple and profound. Mojo writer James McNair described it as "intimate and reflective" and said that it is "easy to get lost in". Steve Horowitz of PopMatters wrote that "Mann is our modern day Dory Previn, whose whip-smart sensibility suggests intelligence and mania at the same time." Craig Dorfman of Paste declared that "Mann has earned her reputation as a master songwriter". Jon Pareles of The New York Times stated that on Mental Illness Mann is "Tunefully Tracing Elegant Despair".

Maura Johnston of The Boston Globe wrote that "Mann crafts a melancholic atmosphere that is worth repeated listens." Greg Kot of the Chicago Tribune declared it as one of Mann's "sparest, quietest albums and also among her most beautiful". Allan Raible of ABC News articulated that this record is "firmly planted in mature soundscapes", that "you may find yourself getting lost in this album's sonic textures" and that with Mental Illness "Aimee Mann continues to be one of the most gripping storytellers writing music today". Dw. Dunphy of Popdose notes that, while the music in Mental Illness is gorgeous, this isn't a "feel good" album. But, for those in the right frame of mind, it's "a warm, plush comforter to crawl into when the self-pity stops working." On January 28, 2018 the album won the Grammy Award for Best Folk Album. It also won Best American Roots & Folk Album at the 2018 A2IM Libera Awards.

== Tour ==
Mann announced the tour, along with the album itself, on January 17, 2017. The tour encompassed performances all around North America, featuring one show in Canada, the rest taking place in the US. The first tour date was April 20, 2017, and the last two months later on June 30, 2017. Along with Mann herself, the tour featured Jonathan Coulton on acoustic guitar, Jay Bellerose on drums, a string quartet, Jamie Edwards on piano, and Paul Bryan on bass while singing backup vocals. Many of the musicians who played on the album also joined Mann on the tour.

== Track listing ==
No.	Title	Length
1.	"Goose Snow Cone"	3:35
2.	"Stuck in the Past"	3:33
3.	"You Never Loved Me"	3:07
4.	"Rollercoasters"	3:44
5.	"Lies of Summer"	2:42
6.	"Patient Zero"	3:41
7.	"Good for Me"	4:09
8.	"Knock It Off"	3:01
9.	"Philly Sinks"	3:14
10.	"Simple Fix"	4:12
11.	"Poor Judge"	3:33
Total length:		38:29

The Japanese edition of the album has an additional bonus track, "Throw You Over".

== Personnel ==
- Aimee Mann – lead vocals, bass, acoustic guitar, percussion
- Paul Bryan – producer
- Ted Leo – background vocals
- Paul Bryan – bass, background vocals
- Jonathan Coulton – acoustic guitar, background vocals
- Jay Bellerose – drums, other percussion
- Jamie Edwards – piano, harmonium, acoustic guitar, 12 string guitar

=== String section ===
==== Quartet ====
- Eric Gorfain – Violin
- Marisa Kyney – Violin
- Leah Katz – Viola
- Richard Dodd – Cello

==== Violins ====
Amy Wickman, Gina Kronstadt, Terry Glenny, Radu Piepta and Susan Chatman

==== Violas ====
Aaron Oltman and Rodney Wirtz

==== Cello ====
John Krovoza and Peggy Baldwin

== Charts ==
Chart (2017)	Peak position
Belgian Albums (Ultratop Flanders)	112
German Albums (Offizielle Top 100)	69
Irish Albums (IRMA)	33
New Zealand Heatseekers Albums (RMNZ)	6
Scottish Albums (Official Charts)	36
Swiss Albums (Schweizer Hitparade)	70
UK Albums (Official Charts)	53
UK Americana Albums (Official Charts)	1
UK Independent Albums (Official Charts)	5
US Billboard 200	54
