= Gun Shy, Trigger Happy =

Studio album by Jen Trynin
- Released: August 12, 1997
- Recorded: 1997
- Genre: Alternative rock
- Label: Squint/Warner Bros.
- Producer: Mike Dennen

Jen Trynin chronology
Cockamamie (1994)	Gun Shy, Trigger Happy (1997)

Professional ratings
Review scores
Source	Rating
AllMusic	4/5 stars
Entertainment Weekly	A
MusicHound Rock: The Essential Album Guide	3/5 stars

Gun Shy, Trigger Happy is the second (and, to date, final) album by Boston musician Jen Trynin. It was released in 1997 on Squint/Warner Bros. Records. It was listed as Entertainment Weekly's album of the year for 1997 and topped many other critic's lists.

== Recording and promotion ==
Trynin wrote the songs for the album on an acoustic guitar in her living room, following the tour for her debut album Cockamamie.

An EP was originally planned to precede the album, due to Trynin's concerns that the more polished Gun Shy would be jarring to fans; after officially signing Trynin, Danny Goldberg ordered instead that the album be released. The song "February" was chosen as the first single from the album. Since Warner Bros. Records were going to release it in the summer, they forced her to change the song's name to "Getaway" (on the album itself it is listed under both titles).

A music video was shot for the song to help promote it, however it has never been released. In her 2006 book Everything I'm Cracked Up to Be, Trynin recalled that everyone "[hated] the rough cut of the "Getaway (February)" video, because it's super-hip and happening and no one knows what the hell is going on in it." In 1998, the song "Writing Notes" was featured in the Parker Posey film The Misadventures of Margaret.

== Critical reception ==
Stephen Thomas Erlewine of AllMusic praised the album. He wrote in his review that "Cockamamie, Jennifer Trynin's accomplished debut, got lost in the shuffle of all the post-alternative female singer-songwriters of the mid-'90s. Many of those songwriters were less talented than Trynin but were more commercially savvy and, therefore, successful. Perhaps this is the reason her second album, Gun Shy Trigger Happy, has a slicker production than Cockamamie, but even with the polish, Trynin remains one of the better adult-alternative songwriters of the late '90s."

A review from People published on September 22, 1997, calls it "one of 1997’s strongest and most mature discs." The review states that "Her 1994 debut, Cockamamie, showed admirable grrrlish spunk and a few knockout songs, but promising as that release was, it barely hinted at the giant leap forward this 33-year-old Bostonian takes on her dazzling follow-up. Gun Shy Trigger Happy is a musical tour de force—13 meticulously produced cuts that feature Trynin’s hypnotic vocals, gritty guitar playing and grown-up lyrics about faltering relationships and lost innocence."

The Washington Post wrote: "An aggressive electric guitarist, [Trynin]'s as likely to make her case with a sharp riff as a keen phrase." The Chicago Tribune called the album "another dose of sharp hook-slinging." The Tulsa World wrote that Trynin "can wax nostalgic and ache with regret at the same time ('Writing Notes') or walk calmly and cooly [sic?] right out of your life, leaving you with the check ('I Don't Need You')—all without a single moment of ranting."

== Track listing ==
All songs written by Jen Trynin.

1. "Go Ahead"
2. "Getaway (February)"
3. "If I"
4. "Writing Notes"
5. "Everything"
6. "Bore Me"
7. "Love Letter"
8. "Washington Hotel"
9. "I Resign"
10. "I Don't Need You"
11. "Around It"
12. "Under the Knife"
13. "Rang You & Ran"

== Personnel ==
Musicians

- Chris Foley – drums, percussion
- Mike Denneen – keyboards, programming
- Jennifer Trynin – guitar, vocals
- Ed Valauskas – bass

Production

- Danny Clinch – photography
- Mike Denneen – engineer, mixing, producer
- Richard Marr – mixing
- Susie Tallman – production coordination
- Roberto Toledo – mixing
- Jonathan Wyner – mastering
