= Cockamamie =

Studio album by Jen Trynin
- Released: 1994
- Recorded: 1994
- Genre: Indie rock, alternative rock
- Label: Squint, Warner Bros.
- Producer: Mike Denneen

Jen Trynin chronology
Cockamamie (1994)	Gun Shy, Trigger Happy (1997)

Singles from Cockamamie
- 1. "Better Than Nothing" Released: 1995

Cockamamie is the debut album from Boston-based musician Jen Trynin. First released in 1994, the album failed to do well on the charts when re-released by Warner Bros. Records in 1995, in spite of positive reviews. "Better Than Nothing" was released as a single.

The story of how this album came to be and the process regarding its release on Warner Bros. is chronicled in Trynin's 2006 book Everything I'm Cracked Up to Be.

== Critical reception ==
Professional ratings
Review scores
Source	Rating
AllMusic	4.5/5 stars
Robert Christgau	(neither)
Los Angeles Times	3.5/4 stars
Spin	5/10

Billboard called the album "one of the year's best debuts."

== Track listing ==
All songs written by Jen Trynin.

1. "Happier"
2. "Better Than Nothing"
3. "Everything Is Different Now"
4. "One Year Down"
5. "Snow"
6. "All This Could Be Yours"
7. "Too Bad You're Such a Loser"
8. "Knock Me Down"
9. "If I Had Anything to Say (Don't You Think I Would Have Said It All?)"
10. "Beg"
11. "Do It Alone"
  - there is an untitled hidden track that begins at 4:07

== Personnel ==
- Paul Bryan - bass
- Jerry Deupree - drums
- David Gregory - drums
- Mike Levesque - drums
- Aimee Mann - vocals
- Michael Rivard - bass
- Clayton Scoble - backing vocals
- Milt Sutton - drums, percussion
- Jennifer Trynin - guitar, vocals
