= Going Through the Motions =

Going Through the Motions may refer to:

== Songs ==
- "Going Through the Motions" (song), by Aimee Mann, 2005
- "Goin' Through the Motions", by Andy Williams from Andy, 1976
- "Goin' Through the Motions", by Blue Öyster Cult from Spectres, 1977
- "Goin' Through the Motions", remake of Blue Öyster Cult's song by Bonnie Tyler from Faster Than the Speed of Night, 1983
- "Goin' Through the Motions", by Diana Ross from Workin' Overtime, 1989
- "Going Through the Motions", by Kansas from Drastic Measures, 1983
- "Going Through the Motions", by McFly from Radio:Active, 2008
- "Going Through the Motions", by The Prefects, 1979
- "Goin' Through the Motions", by Robbie Nevil from Day 1, 1991
- "Going Through the Motions", by Sarah Michelle Geller (as Buffy) from the Buffy the Vampire Slayer episode Once More, with Feeling, 2001
- "I Sweat (Going Through the Motions)", by Nona Hendryx from the Perfect film soundtrack, 1985

== Other uses ==
- Going Through the Motions, a 1982 novel by Katherine Govier
- Going Through the Motions, a 1979 album by Hot Chocolate
- GTTM: Goin Thru the Motions, a 2017 mixtape by PnB Rock

== See also ==
- Set up to fail
