= Paul Bryan (musician) =

American musician (born 1967)

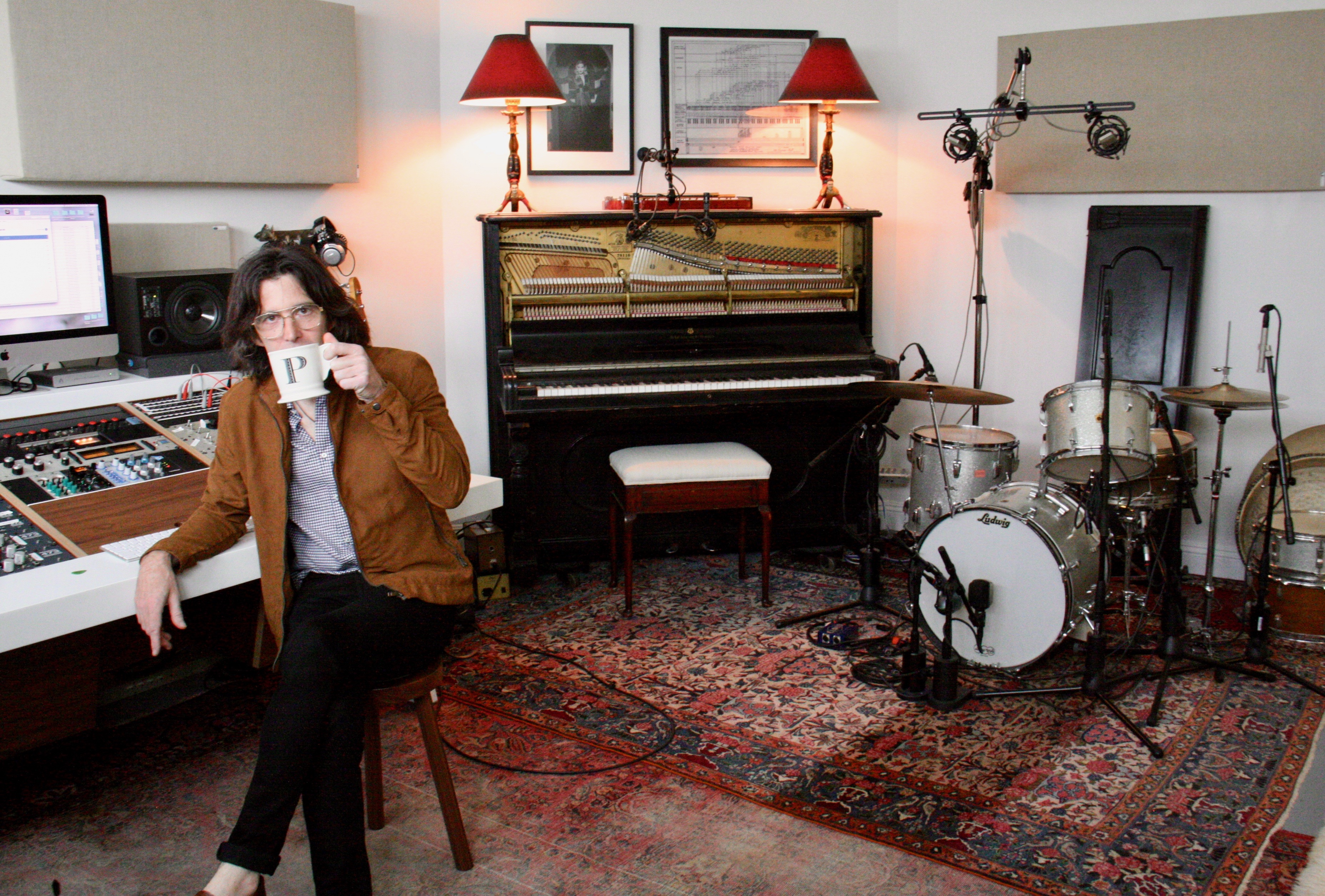

Background information
- Born: April 13, 1967 (age 59); San Pedro, Los Angeles, California
- Origin: United States
- Genres: Pop, rock, progressive, jazz
- Occupations: Musician, songwriter, record producer
- Instrument: Bass guitar
- Years active: 1990–present
- Partner: Emily Procter (2008–present)
- Website: www.paulbryan.us

Paul Bryan (born April 13, 1967) is an American music producer, arranger, songwriter, and bassist. He is a longtime collaborator of the singer-songwriter Aimee Mann.

== Biography ==
=== Music production and arranging ===
Bryan produced four albums by the singer-songwriter Aimee Mann: One More Drifter in the Snow (SuperEgo Records, 2006), @#%&*! Smilers (SuperEgo Records, 2008), Charmer (SuperEgo Records, 2012) and 2017 Grammy winner Mental Illness (SuperEgo Records, 2017). He also produced Grant Lee Phillips' album Little Moon (Yep Roc Records, 2009), Amy Correia's You Go Your Way (2010), the band The Both's self-titled album on Super Ego Records featuring Ted Leo and Aimee Mann, the Glen Phillips album Swallowed by the New (2015), Jennifer Gillespie's Cure For Dreaming (2015), and tracks with Susanna Hoffs of The Bangles. He was also producer, bassist and mixer for Jeff Parker's 2015 record The New Breed and its companion piece, 2020's Suite for Max Brown.

Bryan wrote the string and woodwind arrangements for Nina Nastasia's critically acclaimed album Outlaster (Fat Cat Records, 2010).

=== Touring and session work ===
Bryan is a longtime member and bassist of Aimee Mann's touring band. He toured with Lucinda Williams in 2006 and Elvis Costello/Allen Toussaint in 2007, also appearing that year on Jimmy Kimmel Live! as backup to singer-songwriter Nick Lowe.

Bryan toured in 2017 and 2018 as a member of jazz guitarist Jeff Parker's New Breed band, and as a bassist and singer with Rufus Wainwright's All These Poses Tour in 2018 and 2019. He is also a member of Gerry Leonard's Spooky Ghost.

Bryan has recorded with Sam Phillips, Norah Jones, Billy Preston, Ann Peebles, Irma Thomas and Mavis Staples.

=== Solo work ===
Bryan also released a solo album of lyric-driven songs, Handcuff King (The Bats Is Happy Records, 2004).

His 2020 self-release Cri$el Gems is a progressive jazz album co-produced by Jeff Parker of Tortoise.

In 2021 Bryan released A Better Ghost, a collaboration with saxophonist Dustin Laurenzi of Twin Talk and drummer/composer Jeremy Cunningham. Downbeat Magazine gave the album 4 stars. calling it a "moodily poetic and genre-bending jewel." Mojo magazine also gave the record 4 stars, calling it a "less-is-more triumph".

=== Grammy Award ===
Bryan received a 2017 Grammy as producer of Aimee Mann's Mental Illness, which won Best Folk Record.

=== Personal life ===
Bryan has been in a relationship with actress Emily Procter since 2008. On December 8, 2010, Procter gave birth to their daughter, Philippa Frances (called "Pippa"). Bryan lost his home and recording studio in the 2025 Palisades Fire.

== Discography ==
=== Solo albums ===
- 2003: Handcuff King (The Bats Is Happy)
- 2020: Cri$el Gems (self-released)
- 2021: Dustin Laurenzi, Jeremy Cunningham, Paul Bryan – A Better Ghost (Northern Spy)

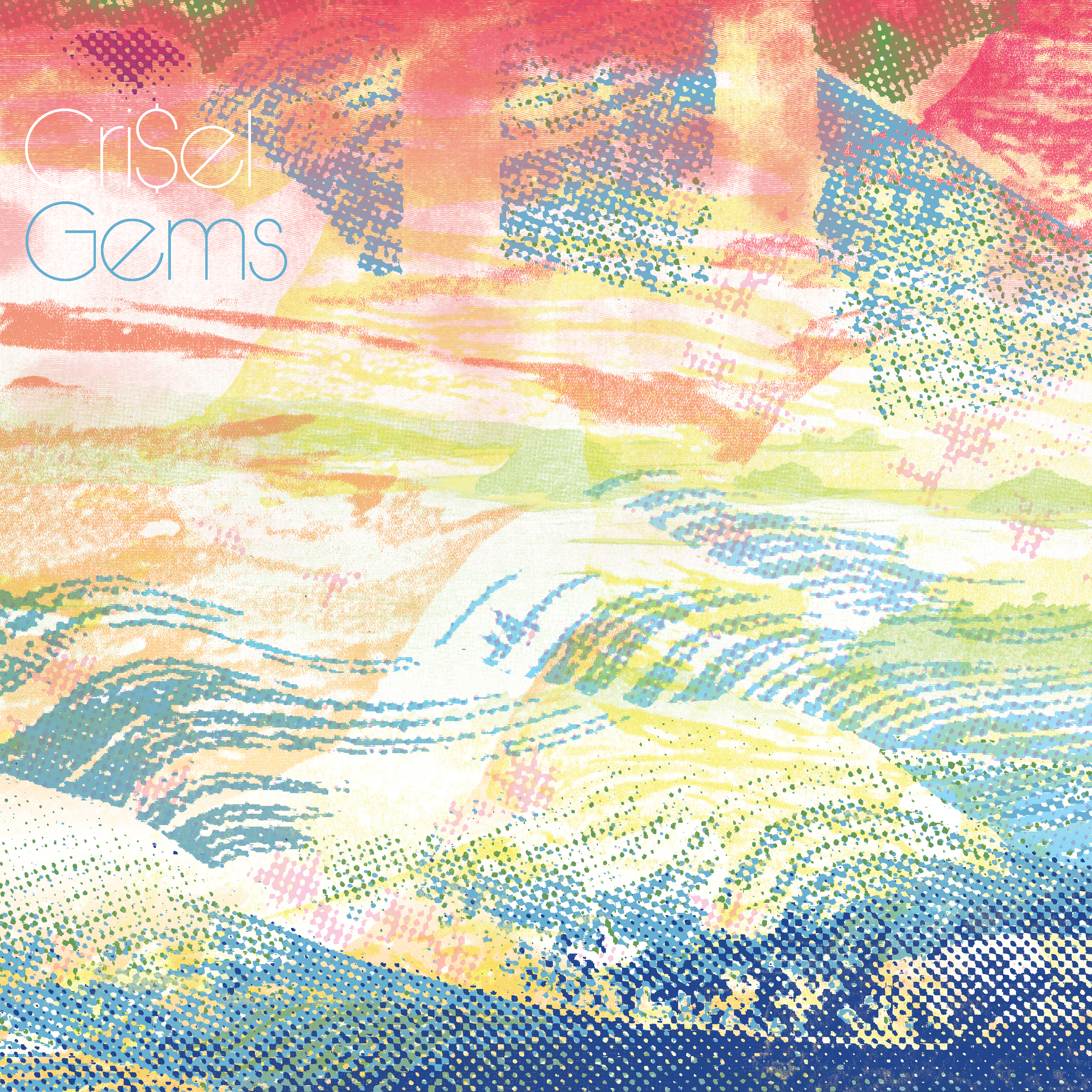
Cri$el Gems cover

=== With Aimee Mann ===
- 2004: Live at St. Ann's Warehouse (SuperEgo) CD, DVD – bass, acoustic guitar, backing vocals
- 2005: The Forgotten Arm (V2) – bass, backing vocals
- 2006: One More Drifter in the Snow (SuperEgo) – producer, bass
- 2008: Fucking Smilers (SuperEgo) – producer, bass, backing vocals, horn arrangements
- 2012: Charmer (SuperEgo) – producer, bass, mellotron, backing vocals
- 2017: Mental Illness (SuperEgo) – producer, arranger, conductor, bass, vocals

=== As producer ===
- 1997: Carol Noonan Band – The Only Witness (Philo)
- 2000: Dennis Brennan – Rule No. 1 (Esca)
- 2001: Tess Wiley – Rainy Day Assembly (Effanel Music)
- 2002: Grey Eye Glances – A Little Voodoo (Sojourn Hill)
- 2002: Gerry Leonard – The Light Machine (Indie)
- 2004: Kenny White – Symphony in 16 Bars (Wildflower)
- 2006: Aimee Mann – One More Drifter In The Snow (Super Ego)
- 2008: Aimee Mann – @#%&*! Smilers (Super Ego)
- 2009: Grant Lee Phillips – Little Moon (YepRoc)
- 2009: Amy Correia – You Go Your Way (Indie)
- 2010: Nina Nastasia – Outlaster (Fat Cat)
- 2011: Gaby Moreno – Illustrated Songs (Indie)
- 2012: Aimee Mann – Charmer (Super Ego)
- 2012: Lindsay Fuller – You Anniversary (ATO)
- 2012: Tanita Tikaram – Can't Go Back (Eagle Rock Entertainment)
- 2014: The Both – The Both (SuperEgo)
- 2016: Jeff Parker – The New Breed (International Anthem)
- 2016: Jenny Gillespie – Cure for Dreaming (Narooma)
- 2016 Glen Phillips Swallowed by the New (Umami Music)
- 2016: Matt Mayhall – Tropes (Skirl)
- 2017: Aimee Mann – Mental Illness (Super Ego)
- 2020: Jeff Parker – Suite For Max Brown (International Anthem)
- 2020: Jeremy Cunningham – The Weather Up There (Northern Spy)
- 2020: Matt Mayhall – Fanatics (self-released)
- 2020: Josh Johnson – Freedom Exercise (Northern Spy)
- 2020: Typical Sisters – Love Beam mixed by
- 2021: Aimee Mann – Queens of the Summer Hotel (Super Ego)
- 2021: Susanna Hoffs – Bright Lights
- 2026: Josh Johnson – Animative (International Anthem/Nonesuch)

=== Also appears on ===
- 1992: Duke Levine – Nobody's Home (Daring) – bass
- 1993: Albert Washington – Step It Up and Go (Iris Musique) – bass
- 1994: Duke Levine – Country Soul Guitar (Daring) – bass
- 1994: Jennifer Trynin – Cockamamie (Warner Bros.) – bass
- 1995: Mighty Sam McClain – Keep on Movin' (Audioquest) – bass
- 1999: Merrie Amsterburg – Season Of Rain (Zoë) – bass
- 1999: Catie Curtis – A Crash Course in Roses (Rykodisc) – organ, djembe, shaker, percussion, bass
- 2000: Merrie Amsterburg – Little Steps (Zoë) – bass, synthesizer, congas)
- 2000: Dennis Brennan – Rule No. 1 (Esca) – vocals, piano, chamberlin, percussion, bass, organ, horn arrangements, Optigan
- 2002: Dan Zanes and friends – Night Time! (Festival Five) – bass
- 2004: Eugene Ruffolo – The Hardest Easy (k5Oats Music) – bass
- 2005: Bettye LaVette – I've Got My Own Hell to Raise (ANTI-) – bass
- 2005: Susan Tedeschi – Hope and Desire (Verve Forecast) – bass
- 2005: Martha Wainwright – Martha Wainwright (Zoë) – bass, keyboards
- 2006: Norah Jones – Not Too Late (Blue Note) – keyboards on track 3, "The Sun Doesn't Like You"
- 2008: Kathleen Edwards – Asking for Flowers (Zoë) – bass
- 2009: Sam Phillips – Don't Do Anything (Indie) – bass
- 2010: Nina Nastasia – Outlaster (FatCat) – bass, string arrangements
- 2014: Jessica Fichot]l – Dear Shanghai (self-released) – Chamberlin, Mellotron
- 2016: Peter Wolf – A Cure for Loneliness (Concord) – bass on track 4, "How Do You Know"
