= My Shirt Looks Good on You =

Studio album by Catie Curtis
- Released: August 21, 2001
- Genre: Folk/Rock
- Length: 50:12
- Label: Rykodisc
- Producer: Trina Shoemaker; Catie Curtis

Catie Curtis chronology
Catie Curtis Live (2000)	My Shirt Looks Good on You (2001)	Acoustic Valentine (2003)

My Shirt Looks Good On You is the seventh album by Catie Curtis.

== Critical reception ==
Professional ratings
Review scores
Source	Rating
AllMusic	3/5 stars

Liana Jonas of AllMusic writes that the album is, "a winning and driven folk-rock collection that explores love in Curtis' signature idealistic fashion."

Colin Berry of NPR says of the album, "It's great listening for both new and old fans."

Carol Harrison of Exclaim! concludes her review with, "This is slick, TV-ready, easy listening country for the Melissa Etheridge set."

== Track listing ==
All tracks are written by Catie Curtis, unless otherwise noted.

No.	Title	Writer(s)	Length
1.	"Run"	Catie Curtis; Jimmy Ryan; Andrew Mazzone; Billy Conway	3:49
2.	"Kiss That Counted"		3:20
3.	"Jane"		3:53
4.	"Patience"	Mark Sandman	2:49
5.	"Love Takes the Best of You"	Catie Curtis; Jimmy Ryan	4:16
6.	"Bicycle Named Heaven"		3:55
7.	"My Shirt Looks Good on You"	Catie Curtis; Jimmy Ryan; Jeff Berlin	3:04
8.	"Don't Lay Down"		3:01
9.	"Elizabeth"		3:18
10.	"Now"		3:31
11.	"Walk Along the Highway"		3:44
12.	"Sugar Cane"	Catie Curtis; Mary Gauthier	3:58
13.	"Hush"		4:04
14.	"The Big Reprise"		3:30
Total length:			50:12

== Musicians ==
- Catie Curtis – Vocals, Guitar, Keyboards
- Jimmy Ryan – Mandolin, Mandocello, Vocals
- Dana Colley – Baritone Saxophone, Tenor Saxophone, Vocals (tracks 4, 6, 8)
- Andrew Mazzone – Bass (tracks 1–5, 8, 12, 13)
- Gail Ann Dorsey – Bass, Vocals (tracks 6, 7, 9–11), Drums (track 14)
- Billy Beard – Drum [Cocktail] (tracks 1, 5, 8)
- Billy Conway – Percussion (track 11), Drums (tracks 1–10, 12–14)
- Duke Levine – Electric Guitar (tracks: 6, 7, 9, 13), Michael Eisenstein (track 7)
- Kris Delmhorst – Harmony Vocals (track 3)
- Julie Wolf – Organ, Vocals, Piano, Clavinet (tracks 2, 6–8, 10, 13)
- Caoimhe O'Hara – Whistle (tracks 5, 14)

== Production ==
- Producer – Catie Curtis
- Producer, Engineer, Center Spread Photography – Trina Shoemaker
- Recorded by Matt Beaudoin
- Recorded by Sue Kappa
- Mastered by Greg Calbi
- Mixed by Paul Conaway, Trina Shoemaker
- A&R – George Howard
- A&R Coordinator – Steve Ellis
- Photography – Tracy Aiguier
- Art Direction – Steven Jurgensmeyer

Track information and credits adapted from the album's liner notes.
