= Ivan & Alyosha =

American band

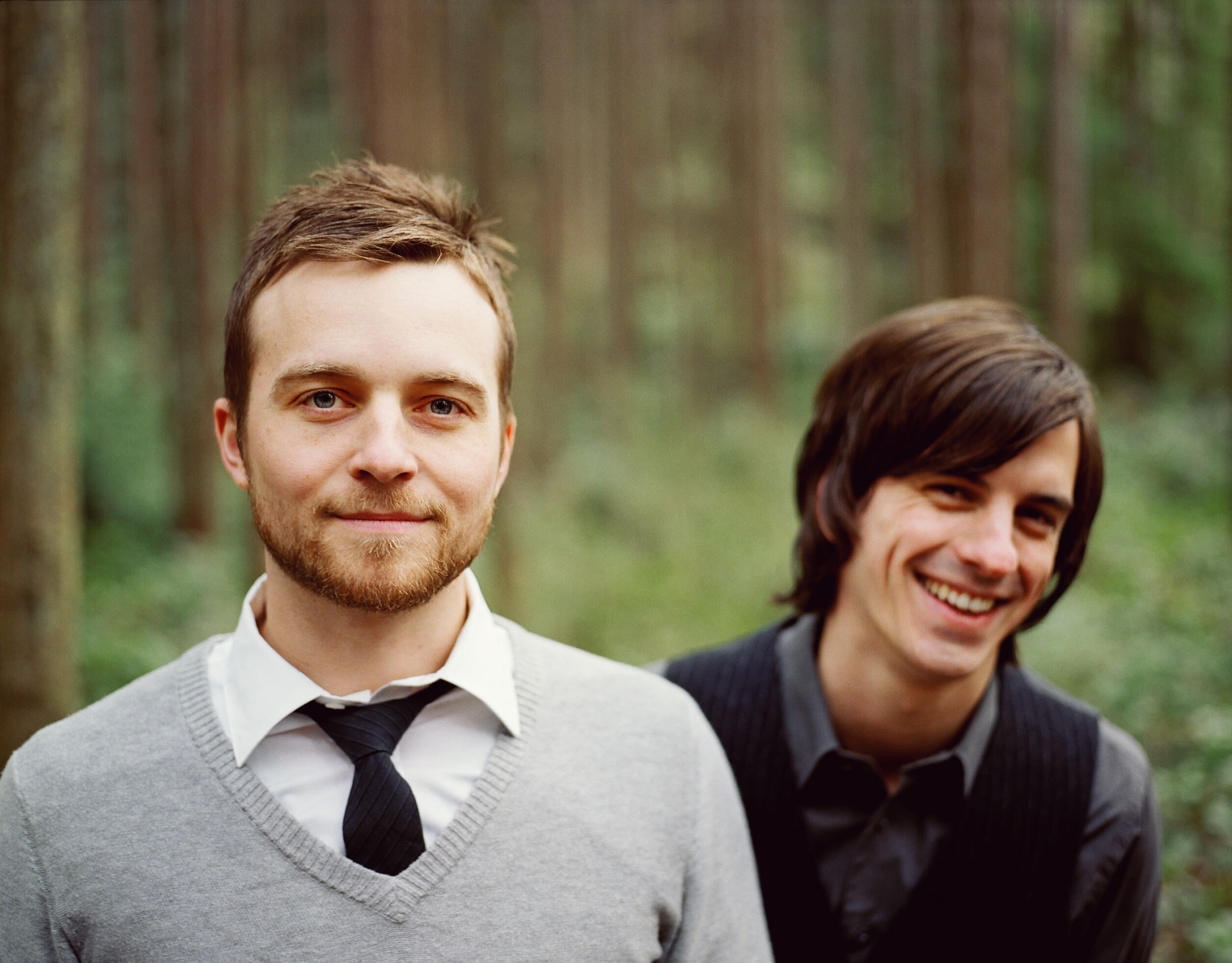
- Tim Wilson and Ryan Carbary

Background information
- Origin: Seattle, Washington, U.S.
- Genres: Indie pop, indie rock
- Years active: 2007–present
- Labels: Dine Alone; Cheap Lullaby; Dualtone; Missing Piece; Nettwerk
- Members: Tim Wilson; Ryan Carbary
- Past members: Pete Wilson; Tim Kim; Cole Mauro
- Website: www.ivanandalyosha.com

Ivan & Alyosha is an American indie rock band from Seattle, formed in 2007 by Tim Wilson and Ryan Carbary. They were later joined by Pete Wilson (Tim's brother) and Tim Kim and added Cole Mauro to complete the group. In 2009 the band was recognized nationally by NPR during coverage of SXSW. Ivan & Alyosha's songs are represented by Downtown Music Publishing.

== Background ==
Ivan & Alyosha was formed by Tim Wilson and Ryan Carbary in 2007. The two met while working on other projects and soon found themselves working exclusively with each other. Together they decided to go into the studio to record. Their first release was an extended play, "The Verse, the Chorus," produced by Eli Thomson in Los Angeles, California. At the time the band did not have a name, but during a discussion about the nameless project Eli Thompson suggested "Ivan and Alyosha" from The Brothers Karamazov. The two original members were fans of the genre and the name stuck. Ivan & Alyosha performed in Texas at SXSW 2010.

The band derives its name from two characters of Fyodor Dostoevsky's masterwork The Brothers Karamazov. The two characters hold opposite views of the world. Ivan rejects God and toys with the idea that "all things are permitted", e.g. sin, and that God is dead. Alyosha, on the other hand, contends that all things are not permitted, and that this is an evidence of God's existence.

Tim and Ryan took roughly a year to write the record the EP The Verse, the Chorus. Ivan & Alyosha spent a few weeks in Los Angeles tracking with Producer Eli Thompson and drummer Frank Lenz in October 2007. Spending six more months on the record mixing at Avast! 2 in Seattle, then mastering by T.W. Walsh in Boston their first release was finally ready. The extended play was released in March 2009.

Ivan and Alyosha was first nationally recognized by NPR, and was highlighted in NPR's All Songs Considered SXSW 2010 preview, and were named one of NPR's top 100 of SXSW .In April, NPR's Song of the Day also featured Ivan & Alyosha, along with a review of their single "Easy to Love"

In Tim Wilson's interview with Spinner he says that the new record would begin production in May 2010. Ivan & Alyosha released the EP entitled, Fathers Be Kind on February 1, 2011. Also, the band was scheduled to start production on a new full length in April 2011. Prior to starting work on the new album, the band toured across the United States starting in February 2011.

All the Times We Had was the band's first full-length album, released on February 26, 2013 with Dualtone Records

Ivan & Alyosha have toured extensively since the release of Fathers Be Kind. Supporting artists that include Brandi Carlile, Aimee Mann, John Vanderslice, The Lone Bellow, and Needtobreathe, I&A have crisscrossed the U.S. and Canada several times, earning a reputation for energetic and fun live performances. The band headed to the UK in March 2014 to support the European release of All The Times We Had on Decca Records.

The group began working on new material soon after the release of their second album, It's All Just Pretend, in 2015. Their EP entitled Labor On was released on May 8, 2020.

In 2023, Tim Wilson and Ryan Carbary decided to continue making music as a two-piece band, and Ivan & Alyosha released their fourth full-length album, All We Ever Had. The album was recorded and produced in Nashville, Tennessee.

== Band members ==
Current lineup

- Tim Wilson – vocals, guitar
- Ryan Carbary – guitar, vocals
- Pete Wilson – bass, vocals
- Tim Kim – guitar, vocals
- Cole Mauro – drums

Touring musicians

- Matt Yeates – drums
- James McAlister – drums
- Cole Mauro – drums
- Jesse Carmichael – drums

== Discography ==
- The Verse, the Chorus (EP) (March 10, 2009)
- Fathers Be Kind (EP) (February 1, 2011)
- "Rebel Jesus" - Single (December 6, 2011)
- The Cabin Sessions (June 19, 2012)
- "Running for Cover" - Single (December 4, 2012)
- "Easy to Love" - Single (January 22, 2013)
- All the Times We Had (February 26, 2013)
- It's All Just Pretend (May 5, 2015)
- Labor On (EP) (May 8, 2020)
- Ivan & Alyosha (October 23, 2020)
- A Very Merry Christmas with Ivan & Alyosha (November 5, 2020)
- Live at Benaroya Hall (feat. The Seattle Symphony, Lee Mills & Andrew Joslyn) (June 24, 2022)
- All We Ever Had (August 23, 2023)

I&A also released a cover of Bob Dylan's "You Changed My Life" on the collaborative album, A Tribute to Bob Dylan in the 80s.
