= Going Through the Motions (song) =

Single by Aimee Mann

from the album The Forgotten Arm
- Released: March 2005
- Length: 2:57
- Label: SuperEgo (US); V2 (Europe)
- Songwriter: Aimee Mann
- Producer: Joe Henry

Aimee Mann singles chronology
| "Pavlov's Bell" (2003) | "Going Through the Motions" (2005) | "Video" (2005) |

"Going Through the Motions" is a song by American singer-songwriter Aimee Mann, which was released in 2005 as the lead single from her fifth studio album The Forgotten Arm. The song was written by Mann and produced by Joe Henry. "Going Through the Motions" peaked at No. 18 in the US Billboard Adult Alternative Songs chart.

== Background ==
"Going Through the Motions" is one of a number of tracks on The Forgotten Arm to be based on the subject of substance abuse. The song was inspired by Mann's own experience with a friend who was addicted to crack cocaine and suffered a number of post-treatment relapses. Mann said about the song's inspiration to Womanrock.com in 2005, "It was like a phone call I had with him, where he was out of treatment, in a half way house, and was super manic and you just know. He relapsed shortly after that."

== Critical reception ==
In a review of The Forgotten Arm, Patrick Berkery of The Philadelphia Inquirer described "Going Through the Motions" as "typical of Mann's better songs: catchy yet fatalistic". Jim Farber of the Daily News wrote, "Mann has some strong musical moments. 'Going Through the Motions' shows her flair for power-pop." Trouser Press considered the song to be one of three songs on The Forgotten Arm that are "immediately engrossing".

Zeth Lundy of PopMatters felt the song, along with "Clean Up for Christmas", deals with "addictions [that] are confronted but never resolved". In a review of Mann's 2005 concert at the Royce Hall, Steven Mirkin of Variety said of the song, "'Going Through the Motions' — a kissoff to a junkie lover — is wonderfully balanced between short and long phrases, the lyrics finely honed couplets dipped in poison."

== Track listing ==
CD single (promo)

1. "Going Through the Motions" – 2:57

== Personnel ==
Going Through the Motions

- Aimee Mann – lead vocals, guitar
- Chris Bruce, Julian Coryell – guitar
- Jebin Bruni – keyboards
- Paul Bryan – bass, backing vocals
- Jay Bellerose – drums

Production

- Joe Henry – producer
- Ryan Freeland – mixing, recording
- Chris Reynolds, Jason Mott – assistant engineers
- Gavin Lurssen – mastering

== Charts ==
| Chart (2005) | Peak position |
|---|---|
| US Adult Alternative Airplay (Billboard) | 18 |
