= Charmer (Aimee Mann album) =

Studio album by Aimee Mann
- Released: September 17, 2012
- Recorded: Stampede Origin, Los Angeles
- Genre: Pop rock
- Length: 38:02
- Label: SuperEgo
- Producer: Paul Bryan

Aimee Mann chronology
@#%&*! Smilers (2008)	Charmer (2012)	Mental Illness (2017)

Singles from Charmer
- 1. "Charmer" Released: June 25, 2012; 2. "Labrador" Released: September 18, 2012; 3. "Soon Enough" Released: November 8, 2012

Charmer is the eighth studio album by singer-songwriter Aimee Mann, released by SuperEgo Records in the UK on September 17, 2012, and in the US on September 18.

The album was produced by Mann's bassist, Paul Bryan, and features a guest appearance by The Shins frontman James Mercer, who duets with Mann on the track "Living a Lie." It debuted on the Billboard 200 at No. 33.

Laura Linney and John Hodgman star in the music video for the first single, "Charmer."

The video for the second single, "Labrador," is a shot-for-shot remake of the video for "Voices Carry," the 1985 hit of Mann's former band, 'Til Tuesday, with the exception of Town Hall replacing Carnegie Hall.

== Reception ==
Professional ratings
Aggregate scores
Source	Rating
Metacritic	(73/100)
Review scores
Source	Rating
Allmusic	4/5 stars
American Songwriter	3/5 stars
Blurt	8/10 stars
Consequence of Sound	3.5/5 stars
musicOMH	3/5 stars
No Ripcord	5/10 stars
PopMatters	8/10 stars
Rolling Stone	2.5/5 stars
Under the Radar	6/10 stars
Uncut	(8/10)

Charmer so far has a score of 73 out of 100 from Metacritic based on "generally favorable reviews". Jody Rosen, in Rolling Stone magazine, criticized its lyrics and production concluding "[T]here's little new here, and even less charm". Allmusic, however, was more positive, citing its hooks as "spiky and precise", and concluding that it was "an immediate, engaging pop record".

Other reviews are positive: Filter gave the album a score of 84% and stated that "Thirty years in, Mann continues to charm, a hidden glint in her eye." Mojo gave the album four stars out of five and called it "an Americana and power-pop confection with piano and tasteful guitars swaddled in the choicest vintage tones." The Independent gave it a favorable review and called it "Another sweet viper's bite of post-Freudian dyspepsia from the singersongwriter who loves to mistrust." Paste gave it a score of 7.8 out of ten and stated: "The simple fact that Aimee Mann continues writing songs around these distressing observations and putting them out on such achingly beautiful records seems proof that-despite all the twisted, cutting truths she's spied under the lens of her artistic microscope—she still somehow clings to the sable cloud's silver flash." The A.V. Club gave it a B and said that Mann "is able to match her ideas to music with real kick."

Other reviews are average or mixed: Q gave the album three stars out of five and called Mann "good and snarky". The New York Times gave it an average review and said it "represents a sunny term for [Mann], at least in relative terms." The Boston Globe, however, gave it a mixed review and stated: "Too many tracks flirt with flat inconsequentiality, and too often the lyrics slip by without the sting of Mann's normally incisive wordsmithery."

== Track listing ==
All songs written by Aimee Mann, except where noted.

1. "Charmer" – 3:25
2. "Disappeared" – 3:24
3. "Labrador" – 3:49
4. "Crazytown" – 3:21
5. "Soon Enough" (Mann, Tim Heidecker) – 3:59
6. "Living a Lie" (featuring James Mercer) (Mann, Paul Bryan) – 3:26
7. "Slip and Roll" – 4:12
8. "Gumby" – 2:53
9. "Gamma Ray" – 3:00
10. "Barfly" – 4:00
11. "Red Flag Diver" – 2:29
12. "Brother's Keeper" (Bonus Track) – 4:06 (Note: Available on both the Australian and Japanese versions of Charmer, in the Australian iTunes store, or released as the A side on a 7" vinyl as a bonus for those who preordered Charmer on vinyl at select record stores)
13. "Mea Culpa" (Bonus Track) – 2:29 (Note: Available on the Australian version of Charmer, in the Australian iTunes store, and released as the B side on a 7" vinyl as a bonus for those who preordered Charmer on vinyl at select record stores)
14. "Swanee River" (Bonus Track) – 4:08 (Note: Alluded to in at least one interview with Aimee Mann, though this song does not appear in any typical version of the album.)

== Personnel ==
- Aimee Mann – lead vocals, acoustic guitar
- James Mercer – vocals on "Living a Lie"
- J. J. Johnson – drums
- Jay Bellerose – percussion
- Chris Bruce – electric guitar
- David Daniels – electric guitar, ebow
- Paul Bryan – bass, Mellotron, background vocals
- Jebin Bruni – piano, keyboards
- Jamie Edwards – electric guitar, piano, keyboards, tubular bells
