= One More Drifter in the Snow =

Studio album by Aimee Mann
- Released: October 31, 2006
- Recorded: May–August, 2006
- Genres: Rock, Christmas
- Length: 33:05
- Label: SuperEgo
- Producer: Paul Bryan

Aimee Mann chronology
The Forgotten Arm (2005)	One More Drifter in the Snow (2006)	@#%&*! Smilers (2008)

Professional ratings
Review scores
Source	Rating
Allmusic	link
The A.V. Club	B+ link
Entertainment Weekly	B+ link
musicOMH	link
Prefix Magazine	(6.5/10) link
Uncut	link
Q	3/5 stars

One More Drifter in the Snow is a Christmas album by the American singer-songwriter Aimee Mann, released by SuperEgo Records in the United States on October 31, 2006. It comprises covers of Christmas standards and two original compositions: "Christmastime", written by Mann's husband, Michael Penn, and "Calling on Mary". Grant-Lee Phillips narrates on "You're a Mean One, Mr. Grinch". It was the first of several albums produced by Mann's bassist, Paul Bryan. As of December 2008, the album had sold 39,000 copies in US.

== Composition ==
Mann began recording One More Drifter in the Snow in May 2006. She said it did not take long to "get into the Christmas vibe". Mann said she did not enjoy Christmas songs that use modern genres, and instead drew inspiration from classic Christmas records by Bing Crosby, Frank Sinatra, Peggy Lee and the Vince Guaraldi Trio.

Mann cited the influence of Johnny Mathis' album Merry Christmas (1958), deciding to "go the Mel Tormé, Dean Martin, Frank Sinatra, lounge-y, sort of Julie London record" rather than make an album in the style of "the groovy modern Christmas records". Another inspiration was the Vince Guaraldi Trio's soundtrack for the 1965 film A Charlie Brown Christmas. which Mann said "has a lot of dark and mysterious undertones. First, Charlie Brown is depressed by the commercialism of Christmas and then there's Linus, who steps out to tell the story of the nativity, with this heartbreakingly moral stance. We wanted our take to be all that – mysterious, quiet, moody. And classy."

== Track listing ==
1. "Whatever Happened to Christmas?" (Jimmy Webb)
2. "The Christmas Song" (Mel Tormé, Bob Wells)
3. "Christmastime" (Michael Penn)
4. "I'll Be Home for Christmas" (Walter Kent)
5. "You're a Mean One, Mr. Grinch" (Theodor Geisel, Albert Hague)
6. "Winter Wonderland" (Felix Bernard, Richard B. Smith)
7. "Have Yourself a Merry Little Christmas" (Hugh Martin, Ralph Blane)
8. "God Rest Ye Merry Gentlemen" (Traditional)
9. "White Christmas" (Irving Berlin)
10. "Calling on Mary" (Aimee Mann, Paul Bryan)

== Personnel ==
- Aimee Mann – vocals, guitar
- Jay Bellerose – percussion
- Paul Bryan – bass guitar
- Ryan Freeland – recording engineer
- Duke Levine – guitar
- Patrick Warren – keyboards
- Grant-Lee Phillips – vocals
