= Live at St. Ann's Warehouse =

Live album by Aimee Mann
- Released: November 2, 2004
- Recorded: June 22–24, 2004
- Venue: St. Ann's Warehouse, New York
- Genre: Pop, rock
- Length: 58:20
- Label: SuperEgo
- Producer: Barry Ehrmann, Pierre Lamoureux

Aimee Mann chronology
Lost in Space (2002)	Live at St. Ann's Warehouse (2004)	The Forgotten Arm (2005)

Live at St. Ann's Warehouse is a live album by the American singer-songwriter Aimee Mann, released in 2004 by SuperEgo Records. It was recorded in Brooklyn, New York City.

== Critical reception ==
Professional ratings
Review scores
Source	Rating
AllMusic	4/5 stars
Paste	(positive)
RTÉ.ie	2/5 stars
Stylus Magazine	B−

Paste magazine noted that the album includes the "beautiful, incisive pop gems" of the Magnolia film soundtrack, "Wise Up" and "Save Me", and opined: "While hardly a revelation musically—each song is rendered in about the manner you'd hear it on record—this 2004 performance offers an enjoyable glimpse of the congenial woman behind some of your favorite wan, doomed-relationship ditties." Conversely, RTÉ.ie wrote: "[Mann's] almost brittle voice doesn't really lend itself well to singing live though, which is unfortunate because she sounds really good on the albums."

== Track listing ==
=== CD ===
1. "The Moth" – 3:46
2. "Sugarcoated" – 3:57
3. "Going Through the Motions" – 2:53
4. "Amateur" – 4:41
5. "Wise Up" – 3:21
6. "Save Me" – 4:43
7. "Stupid Thing" – 4:14
8. "That's Just What You Are" – 4:26
9. "Pavlov's Bell" – 4:34
10. "Long Shot" – 5:32
11. "4th of July" – 3:29
12. "King of the Jailhouse" – 5:41
13. "Deathly" – 7:03

=== DVD ===
1. "The Moth"
2. "Calling It Quits"
3. "Sugarcoated"
4. "Going Through The Motions"
5. "Humpty Dumpty"
6. "Amateur"
7. "Wise Up"
8. "Save Me"
9. "Stupid Thing"
10. "Pavlov's Bell"
11. "Long Shot"
12. "4th of July"
13. "Red Vines"
14. "Invisible Ink"
15. "King of the Jailhouse"
16. "Deathly"
