= All the Times We Had =

Studio album by Ivan & Alyosha
- Released: February 26, 2013
- Studio: Avast! & Electrokitty (Seattle, WA)
- Genre: Folk-pop, indie pop
- Length: 42:55
- Label: Dualtone
- Producer: Ivan & Alyosha; Chad Copelin

Ivan & Alyosha chronology
The Cabin Sessions (2012)	All the Times We Had (2013)	It's All Just Pretend (2015)

All the Times We Had is the first full-length album by the band Ivan & Alyosha, released on February 26, 2013, by Missing Piece Records, under license to Dualtone Records. It had originally been set to debut in August 2012. The album was generally well-received and sold more than 11,000 copies.

In June 2012, The Cabin Sessions EP, a special preview of the album featuring demo versions of "Be Your Man", "Don't Wanna Die Anymore", "On My Way", and "The Fold", was released, as was a single of the title track, which features harmony vocals by Aimee Mann. "Running for Cover" and "Easy to Love" were released as singles in December 2012 and January 2013, respectively.

== Song information ==
"Easy to Love" had been featured on Ivan & Alyosha's 2009 debut EP, The Verse, the Chorus, and "Fathers Be Kind" had been the title track of their second EP, which came out in 2011, but the band decided to re-record these tracks for inclusion on their first full-length effort because they thought the songs were strong and warranted revisiting. Many of the remaining songs on the album had been part of the band's live show for over a year before they were recorded.

The band wrote "Be Your Man" for their wives. "The Fold" and "Don't Want to Die Anymore" were written by Tim Wilson, who said he was "particularly proud" of them lyrically. Pete Wilson wrote "All the Times We Had" about a bittersweet goodbye between friends.

== Track listing ==
All tracks written by Ivan & Alyosha.

1. "Be Your Man" – 3:56
2. "Fathers Be Kind" – 3:30
3. "Easy to Love" – 3:37
4. "Running for Cover" – 3:56
5. "The Fold" – 4:13
6. "On My Way" – 3:34
7. "Don't Wanna Die Anymore" – 3:41
8. "God or Man" – 4:55
9. "All the Times We Had" (with Aimee Mann) – 3:28
10. "Falling" – 4:02
11. "Who Are You" – 4:09

== Personnel ==
Ivan & Alyosha

- Tim Wilson – lead vocals, acoustic guitar
- Ryan Carbary – electric & acoustic guitar, piano, vocals
- Pete Wilson – bass, vocals, percussion
- Tim Kim – electric guitar, vocals

Additional musicians

- James McAlister – drums, percussion
- Chad Copelin – organ, piano
- Matt Slocum – strings
- Aimee Mann – guest vocal on "All the Times We Had"
- Taylor Johnson – additional guitars
- Jarod Evans – additional guitars
