= A Crash Course in Roses =

Studio album by Catie Curtis
- Released: August 3, 1999
- Genre: Folk Rock
- Length: 52:39
- Label: Rykodisc
- Producers: Catie Curtis, Ben Wisch

Catie Curtis chronology
Catie Curtis (1999)	A Crash Course in Roses (1999)	My Shirt Looks Good On You (2001)

Professional ratings
Review scores
Source	Rating
Allmusic	4/5 stars
New Internationalist	4/5 stars

A Crash Course in Roses is the fifth studio album by Catie Curtis, released on August 3, 1999.

The album contains numerous love songs, with "Magnolia Street", a song about the realization that one is in love, gaining some radio airplay. While the album did not make the Billboard Music Charts, it was her most successful at that stage.

In addition to the love songs which make up the majority of the album, A Crash Course in Roses also bears two other songs: "What's the Matter", a criticism of her hometown of Saco, Maine for rejecting her when she came out as a lesbian, and "Roses", the story of a soldier conscripted into World War I.

Numerous other singer-songwriters appear in supporting roles on the album, including Mary Chapin Carpenter and Melissa Ferrick.

== Track listing ==
Source: Official site, Last.fm

No.	Title	Length
1.	"Gave Me Love"	3:15
2.	"World Don't Owe Me"	3:57
3.	"100 Miles"	5:03
4.	"Fall Away"	3:13
5.	"Wise to the Ways"	4:45
6.	"What's the Matter"	3:18
7.	"I'll Cover You"	4:37
8.	"Burn Your Own House Down"	4:37
9.	"Roses"	4:51
10.	"Look at You Now"	4:08
11.	"Stay up All Night"	3:16
12.	"Magnolia Street"	4:03
13.	"Start Again"	2:44
14.	"Fusco's Song"

== Personnel ==
- Catie Curtis – Vocals, producer, Wurlitzer, acoustic guitar, piano
- Michael Maxwell – gut string guitar
- Hugh McCracken – harmonica
- Sammy Merendino – tambourine, drum programming
- Catherine Russell – gut string guitar
- Ben Wisch – producer, engineer, mixing, Wurlitzer
- Tom "T-Bone" Wolk – accordion, sound effects, bass
- Jim Ryan – gut string guitar, mandolin
- Mark Spencer – electric guitar, slide guitar, National steel guitar, acoustic guitar
- Kenny White – gut string guitar, organ, piano
- Akira Satake – banjo
- Todd Reynolds – violin
- Dawn Buckholz – cello, string arrangements
- Liz Marshall – gut string guitar
- Duke Levine – electric guitar, mandola, omnichord, e-bow, acoustic guitar
- Manolo Badrena – conga, percussion
- Paul Bryan – djembe, shaker, bass pedals, organ, bass, percussion
- Mary Chapin Carpenter – gut string guitar
- Billy Conway – drums, snare drums, percussion
- Melissa Ferrick – gut string guitar
- Jennifer Kimball – gut string guitar
- Jim Robeson – engineer
- Jana Leon – photography
- Steven Jurgensmeyer – design
- Bruce MacFarlane – assistant engineer
- Crit Harmon – engineer
- Kevin Pickering – assistant engineer
- Ted Jensen – mastering
