= The Forgotten Arm =

Studio album by Aimee Mann
- Released: May 3, 2005
- Recorded: Sunset Sound, The Sound Factory
- Genres: Pop, rock
- Length: 47:06
- Label: SuperEgo
- Producer: Joe Henry

Aimee Mann chronology
Live at St. Ann's Warehouse (2004)	The Forgotten Arm (2005)	One More Drifter in the Snow (2006)

The Forgotten Arm is the fifth studio album by the American singer-songwriter Aimee Mann, released on SuperEgo Records on May 3, 2005. It is a concept album set in the 1970s about two lovers who go on the run.

The album reflects Mann's own boxing in its story and illustrations. The title is derived from a move in which one arm is used to hit the opponent, causing him to "forget" about the other arm, which is then used to deliver a harsher blow. The album won the 2006 Grammy Award for Best Recording Package.

== Music and lyrics ==
The Forgotten Arm was produced by Joe Henry and recorded mostly live in the studio. The album details, in a series of vignettes, the story of John, a Vietnam vet and boxer, and his "kind of white trash" girlfriend Caroline, who meet at the Virginia State Fair in the 1970s, where John is boxing an exhibition round. They get the idea that they can escape their problems by running off together and travelling across the United States. However, their relationship begins to fray as John's addiction to alcohol comes to light. In Vegas, John leaves Caroline to try to get help ("Goodbye Caroline") but resists treatment ("I Can't Get My Head Around It") and finally Caroline gives up on trying to help John ("I Can't Help You Anymore"). However, the album's final song indicates that everything works out somehow, although much later. "It's a character study and a relationship study," Mann says.

== Reception ==
Professional ratings
Aggregate scores
Source	Rating
Metacritic	(70/100)
Review scores
Source	Rating
Allmusic	3.5/5 stars
The A.V. Club	(unfavorable)
Entertainment Weekly	B
Paste	4/5 stars
Pitchfork Media	(7.4/10)
PopMatters	(9/10)
Q	3/5 stars
Rolling Stone	3/5 stars
Uncut	4/5 stars
The Village Voice	(favorable)

The Forgotten Arm has a score of 70 out of 100 from Metacritic based on "generally favorable reviews". Prefix Magazine gave it seven out of ten and said it has "enough bending guitar licks to satisfy the yuppiest of thirtysomething businessmen and enough mellow ballads to satisfy your Dixie Chicks-loving mom". Trouser Press gave it a positive review and said, "Some of the songs are immediately engrossing... Others mostly carry the story forward while allowing Mann to indulge her career-long taste for vintage keyboard orchestration, coolly elegant pop arrangements and displays of tart wordplay."

E! Online gave The Forgotten Arm a B− and said it "reveals how straight-up dull Mann's country-tinged songs can be". Mojo gave it three out of five and called it "an unfussy affair". Blender gave it two out of five and said: "If [Mann] doesn't follow commercial formulas, she's following creative ones, and selling herself short in the process." The A.V. Club gave it an unfavorable review, writing that "Mann's signature wordplay sounds clichéd and exhausted, and her melodies lack the energy and pop sparkle that distinguished her pre-Lost In Space work". The album won the 2006 Grammy Award for Best Recording Package for Mann and Gail Marowitz.

== Track listing ==
All songs written by Aimee Mann.

1. "Dear John" – 3:07
2. "King of the Jailhouse" – 5:19
3. "Goodbye Caroline" – 3:53
4. "Going Through the Motions" – 2:57
5. "I Can't Get My Head Around It" – 3:37
6. "She Really Wants You" – 3:26
7. "Video" – 3:35
8. "Little Bombs" – 3:49
9. "That's How I Knew This Story Would Break My Heart" – 4:19
10. "I Can't Help You Anymore" – 4:52
11. "I Was Thinking I Could Clean Up for Christmas" – 4:23
12. "Beautiful" – 3:48

== Personnel ==
- Aimee Mann – vocals, acoustic guitar, electric guitar
- Jay Bellerose – drums, percussion
- Victor Indrizzo – drums, cowbells, percussion
- Jeff Trott – electric guitar, baritone guitar, mandolin
- Paul Bryan – bass instrument, background vocals
- Jebin Bruni – keyboards
- West End Horns

Also

- Julian Coryell
