= Catie Curtis =

American singer-songwriter

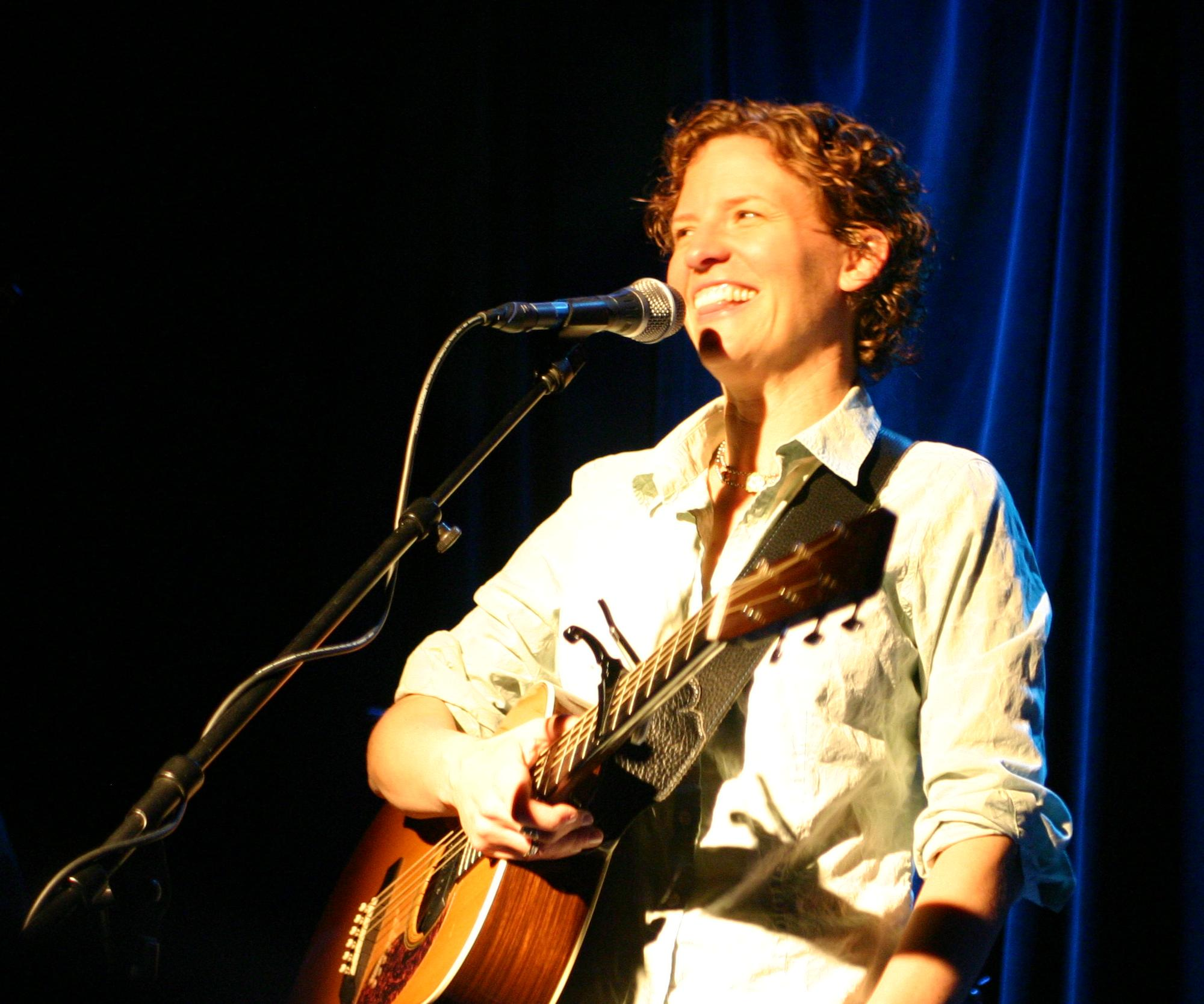
- Curtis in 2006

Background information
- Born: 22 May 1965 (age 61)
- Origin: Boston, Massachusetts, U.S.
- Genres: Folk rock
- Instruments: Guitar
- Years active: 1989–present
- Labels: EMI; Rykodisc; Vanguard; Compass

Catie Curtis (born May 22, 1965) is an American singer-songwriter working primarily in the folk rock idiom. Her most recent album recording, The Raft, was released in 2020.

== Career ==
Curtis was raised in Saco, Maine. By the age of fifteen she was playing drums for a local theater company and in her late teens she sat in with Foreigner on a performance of "I Want to Know What Love Is". She graduated from Brown University in Providence, Rhode Island with a degree in history and moved to Boston, Massachusetts, where she began working the folk rock circuit.

Curtis self-released the cassette-only Dandelion in 1989; her first CD, From Years to Hours, in 1991; and her second CD, Truth from Lies, in 1995. She did not gain wide recognition, however, until a successful appearance at The Bottom Line in New York City led to a contract with EMI/Guardian Records and the re-release of Truth from Lies in 1996. Her 1997 follow-up, Catie Curtis, was named Album of the Year at that year's Gay and Lesbian American Music Awards. Her discography now runs to thirteen albums, including the highly regarded A Crash Course in Roses (1999).

Her songs have featured in Alias, Dawson's Creek, Grey's Anatomy, Felicity and Chicago Hope, as well as in several independent films. In 2005, she and Mark Erelli won the Grand Prize in the International Songwriting Competition for "People Look Around", a song written in response to Hurricane Katrina.

Curtis has toured internationally as both headliner and support act. In 2009, she performed at the HRC Equality Ball in celebration of President Barack Obama’s inauguration. She performed at the White House the following year and again in 2011. Her tenth studio album Hello Stranger (2009) was produced by Garry West, and supported by Alison Brown and Stuart Duncan, along with Gary Marinelli (acoustic guitars, mandolin and resophonic guitar), Kenny Malone (drums and percussion) and Todd Phillips (acoustic bass).

== Personal life ==
Catie Curtis who is a lesbian, was married to Liz Marshall for 17 years, but separated in 2014. Together they have two adoptive daughters, Lucy and MJ Marshall. Curtis is a supporter of same-sex marriage, and is qualified to officiate weddings as of 2010.

== Awards ==
- 1996 Out Song at the Gay and Lesbian American Music Awards for "Radical" from Truth From Lies.
- 1996 Out Recording at the Gay and Lesbian American Music Awards for "Radical" from Truth From Lies.
- 1997 Album of the Year at the Gay and Lesbian American Music Awards for Catie Curtis.
- 1999 Out Song at the Gay and Lesbian American Music Awards for "What's The Matter" from A Crash Course in Roses.
- 2002 Song of the Year on an Indie Label at the Boston Music Awards for "Kiss that Counted".
- 2005 Grand Prize in the International Songwriting Competition for "People Look Around" (with Mark Erelli).

== Discography ==
- Dandelion (1989)
- From Years to Hours (Hear Music, Mongoose Music, 1991)
- Truth from Lies (Guardian Records, 1995)
- Catie Curtis (Rykodisc, 1997)
- A Crash Course in Roses (Rykodisc, 1999)
- Catie Curtis Live (Rykodisc, 2000)
- My Shirt Looks Good on You (Rykodisc, 2001)
- Acoustic Valentine (Sam the Pug Records, 2003)
- Dreaming in Romance Languages (Vanguard, 2004)
- Long Night Moon (Compass Records, 2006)
- Sweet Life (Compass Records, 2008)
- Hello, Stranger (Compass Records, 2009)
- Stretch Limousine on Fire (Compass Records, 2011)
- A Catie Curtis Christmas (Catie Curtis Records, 2012)
- Flying Dream (Catie Curtis Records, 2014)
- While We're Here (Catie Curtis Records, 2017)
- The Raft (Catie Curtis Records, 2020)

A 2003 compilation, From Years to Hours: The Early Recordings, combines eight of the eleven tracks from the 1991 album with four other early songs.
