= The Both =

American musical duo (2013–2016)

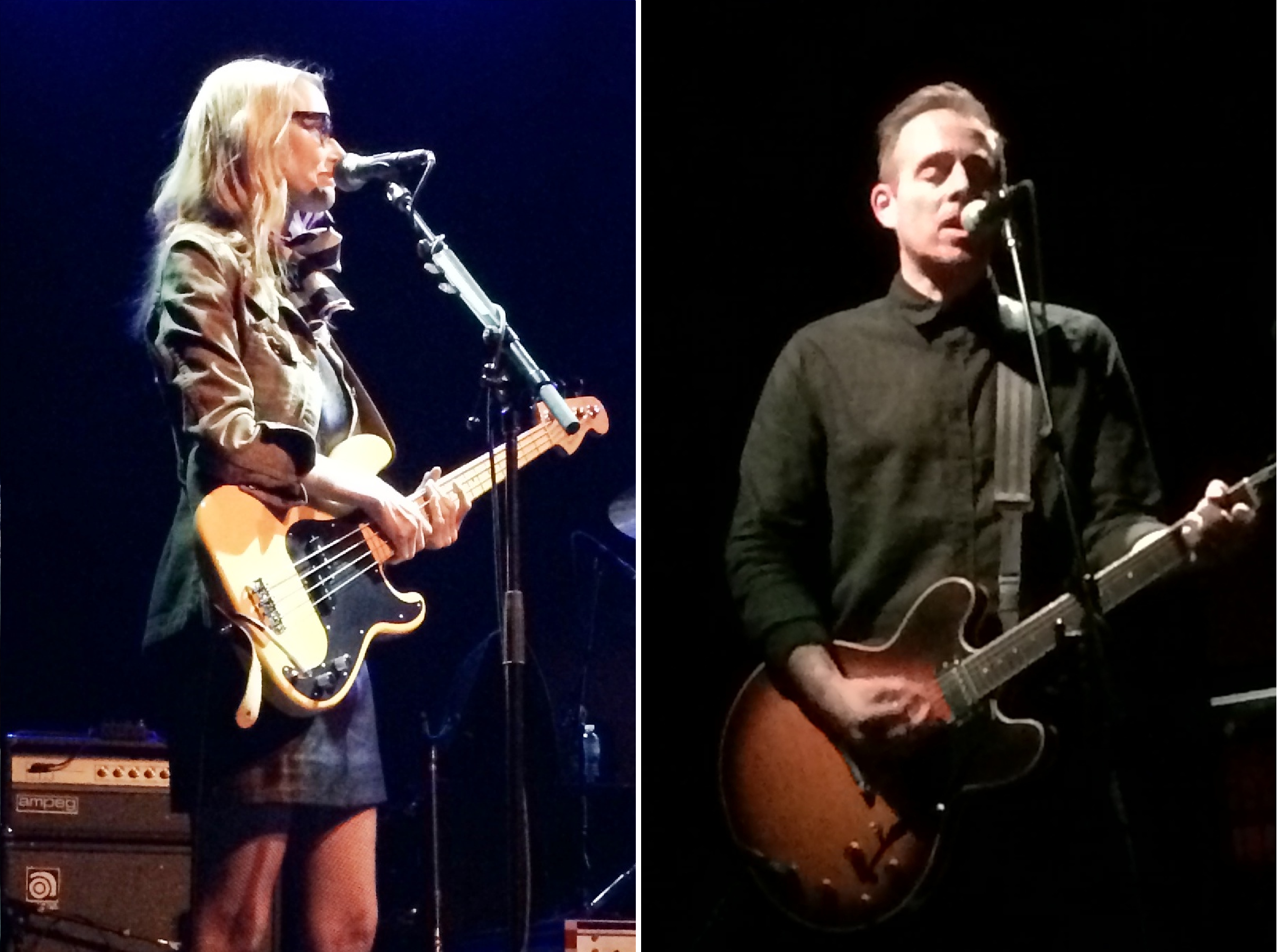
- The Both (Aimee Mann and Ted Leo) in Philadelphia on May 3, 2014

Background information
- Genres: Indie rock, power pop
- Years active: 2013–2016
- Label: SuperEgo
- Spinoff of: Ted Leo and the Pharmacists
- Past members: Aimee Mann; Ted Leo
- Website: www.the-both.com

The Both was an American indie rock band, consisting of Aimee Mann on bass and vocals and Ted Leo on guitar and vocals. They began collaborating in 2013, and released a self-titled album in April 2014.

== Origins ==
Ghost logo of the Both, used on T-shirts and album cover

The songwriting collaboration between Aimee Mann and Ted Leo originated during a joint concert tour in 2012, and specifically with an appearance together at the Pabst Theater in Milwaukee, Wisconsin, on November 11, 2012, which was later described in the lyrics of their song "Milwaukee." At that time, Leo was the opening act for Mann, and the two sometimes collaborated on stage. They began writing songs together in December 2012.

Mann and Leo were initially brought to each other's attention in 2001, when Scott Miller, leader of the bands Game Theory and The Loud Family, gave Mann one of Leo's albums. Miller, who died in April 2013, was later described as having a "special, spiritual, guru-like presence" in the heart of the Both's debut album.

On March 8, 2013, the duo performed their first show together as #BOTH, formatting the band's name as a hashtag. This was quickly dropped, with the band renaming to The Both shortly thereafter.

== Personnel and performances ==
Mann and Leo frequently traded off lead vocal duties within their songs, each taking a verse before joining in harmonies that "expertly interw[ea]ve their voices."

Mann performed on bass and acoustic guitar, and Leo performed on electric guitar. In addition, during concerts Leo occasionally played a modeling keyboard to replicate a few overdubs of strings and synthesized flute from the studio recordings that, according to Leo, were "important parts of the songs" to him.

The Both also became known for their extended on-stage "jokey banter", with "quips and asides" described as "nearly as great as the songs they fed into." Their concerts have been called "one part super-group show, and one part close friends... fluidly (and hilariously) play[ing] off of one another."

The Both typically performed with a guest drummer who was introduced and acknowledged, but who had no singing or speaking role onstage. Session drummer Scott Seiver toured with the Both in 2013 and played on the band's debut album. For the band's 2014 tour, Matt Mayhall replaced Seiver on drums, with Mann commenting in an interview, "We're a power trio."

== Releases ==
In 2014, Mann and Leo released The Both, their self-titled debut album. It featured songs written by both members, as well as the Thin Lizzy song "Honesty Is No Excuse." The album was produced by Paul Bryan. The Both debuted on the Billboard 200 at #59, and on the Billboard Independent Albums chart at #12. Music videos by director Daniel Ralston were released for the songs "Milwaukee" and "Volunteers of America."

In 2014 and 2015, prior to tours together billed as "The Aimee Mann and Ted Leo Christmas Show," The Both released Christmas-themed songs as singles. "Nothing Left to Do (Let’s Make This Christmas Blue)," released in November 2014, was described by Stereogum as "a sweet song with some dark lyrics lamenting the feeling of listlessness that can come along with the holiday season." "You're a Gift," released in December 2015, conveyed a wistful theme of holiday anxiety and "longing for someone to hunker down with and enjoy the holiday spirit with."

== Other collaborations ==
Although Mann and Leo did not continue to perform as The Both after 2016, they remained on good terms. In 2019, Mann and Leo began a podcast through the Maximum Fun network, The Art of Process, in which they interview creative personalities on the process of turning ideas into art. Later that year, the two appeared on the animated television film Steven Universe: The Movie, with Mann reprising her role as Opal from the Steven Universe television series; they perform the song "Independent Together" with Pearl's voice actress Deedee Magno Hall.
