= Gary Taxali =

Canadian artist

- Born: Chandigarh, India
- Education: Degree
- Alma mater: Ontario College of Art
- Occupation: Artist
- Website: https://www.garytaxali.com

Gary Taxali is a Canadian artist that works in both fine art and illustration in the realm of pop art. He is known for his retro-inspired art and cartoon-style illustrations.

== Early life and education ==
Gary Taxali was born in Chandigarh, India and raised in Toronto, Ontario, Canada. In 1991, Taxali graduated from the Ontario College of Art and began working as an illustrator. He is a tenured Full Professor at OCAD University's Faculty of Design.

== Career ==
Taxali has lectured at various art schools and belongs to the IPA, (Illustrators’ Partnership of America) and the Stamp Advisory Committee for Canada Post. He has been involved with professional associations including the Juno Awards (Screening Committee), The Society of Illustrators, the National Magazine Awards, the Dallas Society of Visual Communications, and 3×3: The Magazine of Contemporary Illustration.

== Editorial work ==
Taxali's editorial client work include prestigious magazines such as The New York Times, TIME Magazine, Rolling Stone, The New Yorker, GQ, and many others.

== Technique ==
Taxali's style is a mixture of vintage comics and advertising, street art and fine art crossing the line between fine art, design and illustration. He highlights consumer insecurities of today's society using humor and reliable imagery with a comical twist and current societal paradoxes such as human relationships, love, isolation, economic despair and frustration.

Taxali's mediums are mixed-media works on paper, screenprinting, drawings and paintings using repurposed materials in a style inspired by vintage comics, typography and advertising.

== Publications ==
• “The Taxali 300” (2010)

- “This is Silly” (2010) published by Scholastic
- “I Love You, Ok?” published by teNeues (2011)
- “Mono Taxali” published by 24_9 (2011)
- “Happiness with a Caveat” (2017)
- “100 Illustrators” (2017) published by Taschen
- “Signs of Resistance: A Visual History of Protest in America” (2018)

== Awards ==
- American Illustration
- Communication Arts Illustration Annual
- Society of Illustrators (Gold Medal), Print
- Society of Publication Designers
- National Magazine Awards (Gold Medal)
- Chicago Creative Club
- The Advertising and Design Club of Canada
- National Gold Addy
- Shortlist for a Cannes Lion
- The one-show
- Top 100 illustrators by Taschen
- Grammy Nomination in 2009 for Best Art Package for Aimee Mann’s album
- The Whitney Museum of American Art for an original limited edition print for top donors
- The US Library of Congress has Taxali's work in their permanent collection
- The Royal Canadian Mint commissioned Taxali in 2012 to create six artist themed coins with the themes of marriage, birthday, tooth fairy, O Canada, new baby and holiday
- Taxali was selected by the UN as their North American representative for World Hunger Day by the Food and Agriculture Organization of the United Nations (FAO)
