= Everything I'm Cracked Up to Be =

2006 autobiography by Jen Trynin

- Author: Jen Trynin
- Language: English
- Subject: rock music, celebrity
- Genre: autobiography, nonfiction
- Publisher: Harcourt Press
- Publication date: 2006
- Publication place: United States
- Media type: hardcover
- Pages: 368
- ISBN: 0-15-101148-6
- OCLC: 60516744
- Dewey Decimal: 782.42166/092 B 22
- LC Class: ML420.T833 A3 2006

Everything I'm Cracked Up to Be is a book by Boston, Massachusetts-based musician Jen Trynin. The book chronicles her short career as a musician on Warner Bros. Records, from her start as an indie rock musician in Boston to her promotion of her album Cockamamie after its release on Warner Bros.

The book was released to generally strong reviews, with Entertainment Weekly giving it an A−, and Village Voice critic Robert Christgau saying that the book "did for [him] what Cockamamie never did until [he] read her book--grabbed and held."
