= Jen Trynin =

American singer

- Born: Jennifer Trynin; New Jersey, United States
- Origin: Boston, Massachusetts, United States
- Occupations: Singer-songwriter, author
- Years active: 1994–2006, 2015-present
- Website: www.jentrynin.com

Jennifer Trynin (born 1963), is an American singer-songwriter and author from Boston, Massachusetts.

== Career ==
She recorded her debut album Cockamamie in 1994 while running her own desktop publishing business. The track "Better Than Nothing" received considerable airplay on alternative rock radio stations across the United States. She later released her second album, Gun Shy Trigger Happy, in 1997. Trynin would later release a book entitled Everything I'm Cracked Up to Be in 2006 about her experience in the music industry.

Trynin played guitar for Dave Wanamaker's band Loveless, who released an album, Gift to the World, in 2003. After Loveless broke up, she took a break from music to raise her daughter.

In 2015, Trynin formed the band Cujo and began playing semi-regularly at small clubs in and around Boston.

In 2018, Trynin joined Band of Their Own, an all-female supergroup formed to perform at Hot Stove Cool Music, the annual benefit show supporting the Foundation to be Named Later, the charity established by former Boston Red Sox and current Chicago Cubs executive Theo Epstein and his twin brother Paul Epstein. Band of Their Own also features among others Kay Hanley, Freda Love Smith, Tanya Donelly, Gail Greenwood, Magen Tracy, and Jennifer D'Angora. In keeping with the baseball and all-female theme, they chose the name "Band of Their Own" as a tribute to the documentary and subsequent film A League of Their Own about the All-American Girls Professional Baseball League; the band's logo, designed by Greenwood, is modeled on the logo of the AAGPBL.

== Personal life ==
Trynin married Q Division Studios co-founder Mike Denneen, who produced Cockamamie, Gun Shy Trigger Happy, and Gift to the World, in 2000. Their daughter, Grace Trynin Denneen, was born in 2003. They remained married until his death from colon cancer in July 2018.

In November 2018, as a tribute to her late husband, Trynin and her daughter performed "Stacy's Mom," a hit song that Denneen produced for Fountains of Wayne, with Letters to Cleo at the Paradise Rock Club in Boston, featuring Grace on lead vocals. They performed the same tribute with Band of Their Own at Hot Stove Cool Music in February 2019, also at the Paradise Rock Club and again with Grace on lead vocals.

She is of Jewish origin and her husband was a non-practicing Catholic.

== Works ==
=== Discography ===
- Trespassing (12" vinyl EP and cassette) – Pathfinder Records – 1988
- Cockamamie (CD) – Warner Brothers/Squint Records – 1994
- Gun Shy, Trigger Happy (CD) – Warner Brothers – 1997

with the band LOVELESS

- Loveless EP (CD) – Q Division – 2001
- Gift to the World (CD) – Q Division – 2003

=== Compilations ===
- For the Love of Harry: Everybody Sings Nilsson (CD) Music Masters Jazz – 1995 (track "Mourning Glory Story")
- Safe and Sound: A Benefit in Response to the Brookline Clinic Violence (CD) Mercury Records – 1996 (track "Don't Take It Out On Me")
- Respond – A Compilation by Boston Women to Benefit Respond, Inc. (CD) Signature Sounds – 1999 (track "Sad Girl")
- Viva Noel: a Q Division Christmas (CD) Q Division – 1999 (track "The Christmas Song")

=== Charting single(s) ===
- "Better Than Nothing" (1995) – US Modern Rock Tracks #15, US Mainstream Rock Tracks #40, AUS #89

== Bibliography ==
- Everything I'm Cracked Up to Be (ISBN 0-15-101148-6) – Harcourt Press – 2006
