= Aimee Mann =

American singer-songwriter (born 1960)

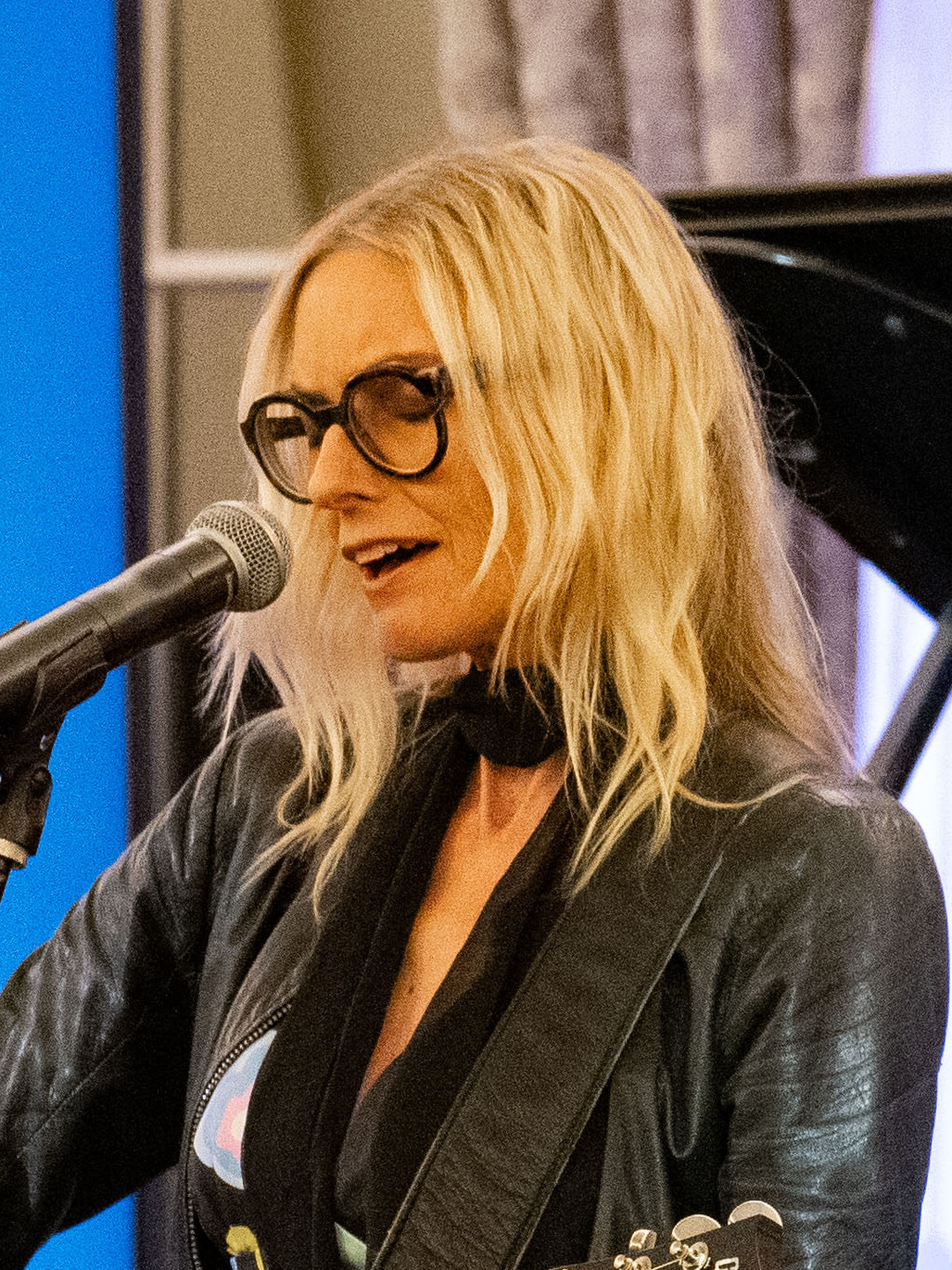
- Mann in 2023

Background information
- Born: Aimee Elizabeth Mann; September 8, 1960 (age 66); Richmond, Virginia, U.S.
- Genres: Alternative rock, folk rock
- Occupations: Musician; singer-songwriter
- Instruments: Vocals; bass; guitar
- Years active: 1980–present
- Labels: SuperEgo; Geffen; Imago
- Formerly of: The Young Snakes; 'Til Tuesday; the Both
- Spouse: Michael Penn (m. 1997)
- Website: aimeemann.com

Aimee Elizabeth Mann (born September 8, 1960) is an American singer-songwriter. She is noted for her sardonic and literate lyrics about dark subjects, often describing underdog characters. She has released ten albums as a solo artist.

Mann was born in Richmond, Virginia, and studied at Berklee College of Music in Boston, Massachusetts. In the 1980s, after playing with the Young Snakes and Ministry, she co-founded the new wave band 'Til Tuesday and wrote their top-ten single "Voices Carry" (1985). 'Til Tuesday released three albums and disbanded in 1990 when Mann left to pursue a solo career.

Mann's first two solo albums, Whatever (1993) and I'm with Stupid (1995), earned positive reviews but low sales. She achieved wider recognition for her soundtrack for the Paul Thomas Anderson film Magnolia (1999). The song "Save Me" was nominated for the Academy Award for Best Original Song and the Grammy Award for Best Female Pop Vocal. Following conflict with her record company, Geffen, Mann released her third album, Bachelor No. 2, on her own label, SuperEgo Records, in 2000. It achieved acclaim and strong sales, establishing Mann as a career artist who could work outside the major label system.

In 2014, Mann released an album with Ted Leo as the Both. She wrote the songs for the 2026 musical Girl, Interrupted and released them as the album Queens of the Summer Hotel (2021). Mann also paints and makes comics, and has appeared in films and television series including The Big Lebowski, Buffy the Vampire Slayer, Steven Universe, The West Wing and Portlandia. Her awards include the Grammy Award for Best Folk Album for Mental Illness (2017). She was named one of the greatest living songwriters by NPR and Paste.

== Early life ==
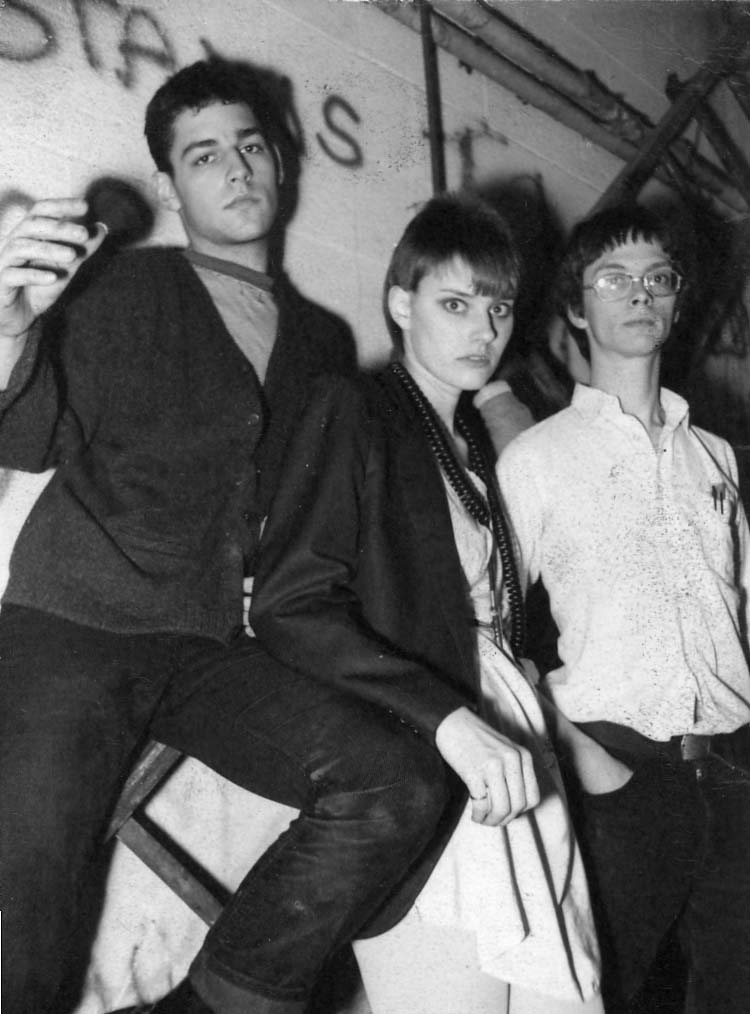
Mann with the Young Snakes in 1981

Mann was born at the Medical College of Virginia, Richmond, on September 8, 1960. She had two brothers and two stepbrothers. When she was three, her mother had an affair and became pregnant and her parents divorced. Mann was kidnapped by her mother and her new boyfriend and taken to Europe, where they traveled. Mann's father, a marketing executive, hired a private detective, who brought her back from England a year later to a new stepmother and two stepbrothers. Mann said her father seemed "like a stranger" when they were reunited. The kidnapping gave Mann post-traumatic stress disorder and anxiety around traveling later in life. She did not see her mother again until she was 14. She forgave her decades later, saying her mother had been "trapped on every side".

Mann grew up in Bon Air, Virginia, and attended Midlothian High School in Chesterfield County. She was withdrawn and would not talk, and her father and stepmother sent her to a psychiatrist. Her drama teacher recalled her as "kind of an insecure kid, very quiet, very introspective … When she did start talking, she was worth listening to." Mann learned to play her brother's guitar when she was confined to bed with glandular fever at the age of 12. As a teenager, she enjoyed David Bowie and Iggy Pop and was inspired by punk and new wave music. She said: "[It] was so interesting, so inventive – literally do whatever you want. That Patti Smith was out there and people were accepting her? Oh my God, there's a way out."

In 1978, feeling she did not fit in the "normal world", Mann enrolled in Berklee College of Music in Boston to study bass guitar. She had wanted to learn the bass as a child, but her family ridiculed her, saying it was unladylike. She lived on $25 a week, running in the mornings and practicing intensely. After 18 months, she dropped out and joined the Boston punk band the Young Snakes on bass. She was unhappy in the band, saying the other members objected to her writing love songs or music they considered too melodic. She joined the band Ministry, which she said helped her learn to write songs efficiently. In the early 1980s, she worked at Newbury Comics in Boston.

== Career ==
=== 1980s: 'Til Tuesday ===
At Berklee, Mann formed a new wave band, 'Til Tuesday, with Mann on bass and vocals. They signed to Epic Records and released Voices Carry, their debut album, in 1985. The single "Voices Carry" reached number eight on the Billboard Hot 100 and won that year's MTV Video Music Award for Best New Artist. According to Mann, "Voices Carry" was one of the first songs she wrote. Stereogum described it as "an early indicator of Mann's penchant for character study, drawing outside the lines of boy-meets-girl love songs". The success made Mann an early female MTV star. The Washington Post described her as "a neo-punk pop princess, a new wave glamour girl, all doe eyes, gangly limbs and spiky bleached hair with that long, braided tail snaking out from underneath".

In 1986, 'Til Tuesday released their second album, Welcome Home. Mann sang backing vocals on "The Faraway Nearby" from the Cyndi Lauper album True Colors, released that year. She sang on the 1987 Rush single "Time Stand Still" and appeared in the music video, and recorded "Sign of Love" for the soundtrack to the 1987 film Back to the Beach. In 1988, 'Til Tuesday released their final album, Everything's Different Now, with songs influenced by Mann's breakup with the singer-songwriter Jules Shear. It demonstrated a significant development in Mann's songwriting, and included a song co-written with Elvis Costello, "The Other End (of the Telescope)". Everything's Different Now was a commercial failure; Mann said it had been abandoned by Epic following a change of staff.

'Til Tuesday broke up in 1990 when Mann left to start her solo career. She said later that her musical interests had changed, and that she was more interested in "acoustic guitar music" than the new wave pop of 'Til Tuesday. In 2025, Mann said: "To be honest, I was the weakest link. My vocals were super high and kind of weird and sort of punky ... I'm surprised we ever got a record deal. But it's an era where we were right in the wave of a certain sound at a certain time, and I think we did that really well for a while." Michael Hausman, the 'Til Tuesday drummer and Mann's former boyfriend, became her manager. Epic did not release Mann from her record contract for another three years, which prevented her from releasing new material. It was the first of several disputes Mann had with record labels, which Hausman said had a lasting effect on her attitude to the music industry.

=== 1990–1995: Solo beginnings, Whatever and I'm with Stupid ===
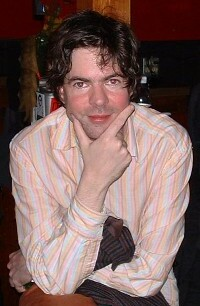
Jon Brion (pictured in 2004) co-produced Mann's first three albums.

Mann recorded her first solo albums with the producer Jon Brion, who had been a member of the 'Til Tuesday touring band. Mann found working with Brion exciting and felt her songwriting improved with him. Together, they developed a sound that the Stereogum writer Doug Bleggi called "LA alternative". Mann's debut solo album, Whatever, was released in 1993 on the independent label Imago. It earned positive reviews but did not meet sales expectations. In 1994, Mann moved to Los Angeles. She also toured as part of the British band Squeeze, playing her own songs and songs by Squeeze. In 1995, Mann lived for about six months in London, where she befriended the Labour politician Tony Banks, a fan of her music.

After Mann finished her second album, I'm with Stupid, Imago encountered financial problems and delayed its release. Imago eventually sold it to Geffen, which signed Mann in 1994 and released the album in 1995. According to Pitchfork, while Mann's solo albums demonstrated she was "a witty, self-possessed songwriter", she was still failing to meet commercial expectations, with sales in the low six figures. Mann began to be seen as a relic of the 1980s. Dick Wingate, the executive who signed 'Til Tuesday to Epic, described her as "the model of an artist who has been chewed up and spit out by the music business", whose disappointment and bad luck had made her distrustful of record labels.

=== 1995–1999: Film work and Magnolia ===
Mann recorded a cover of the 1968 song "One" by Harry Nilsson for the 1995 tribute album For the Love of Harry: Everybody Sings Nilsson. She wrote "Wise Up" for the 1996 film Jerry Maguire, but the director, Cameron Crowe, felt it did not fit. It was included on the Jerry Maguire soundtrack. In 1997, Mann recorded a cover of "Nobody Does It Better", the theme song of the 1977 James Bond film The Spy Who Loved Me, for the album Shaken and Stirred: The David Arnold James Bond Project. Mann contributed her song "Amateur" to the film Sliding Doors and made a cameo in the film The Big Lebowski as a German nihilist, both released in 1998.

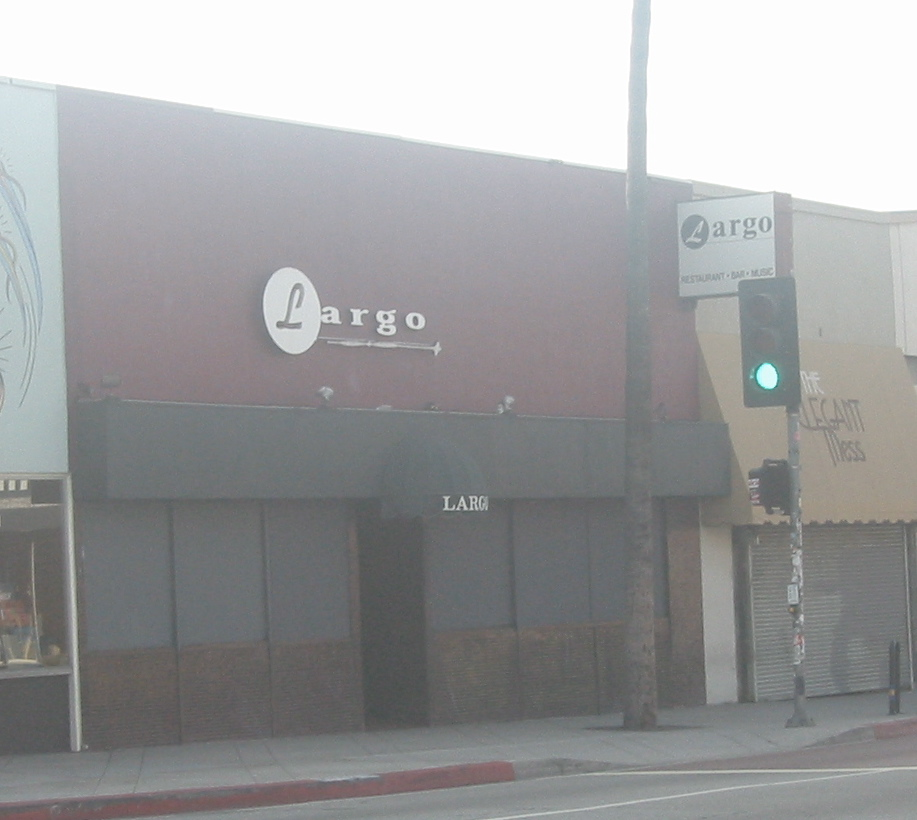
Largo, Los Angeles, where Mann performed regularly in the 1990s

In the late 1990s, Mann became a regular act at Largo, a Los Angeles nightclub where Brion hosted performances from alternative songwriters including Elliott Smith, Fiona Apple and Rufus Wainwright. This shaped Mann's songwriting; Largo fit her so well that the owner jokingly nicknamed it "Aimee Mann's clubhouse".

Mann received wider recognition after she contributed songs to the 1999 film Magnolia, including "One", "Wise Up" and songs she was writing for her third album. She wrote "Save Me" and "You Do" for the film. Magnolia features dialogue taken from Mann's lyrics and a sequence in which the cast sing "Wise Up". The director, Paul Thomas Anderson, another Largo regular, said he "sat down to write an adaptation of Aimee Mann songs".

The Magnolia soundtrack was certified gold. "Save Me" was nominated for a Grammy Award for Best Female Pop Vocal and an Academy Award for Best Original Song; Mann performed it at the 72nd Academy Awards. The Los Angeles Times described "Save Me" as Mann's masterpiece, which "solidified Mann's stature as an esteemed songwriter", and Pitchfork named it among the best songs of the 1990s. Mann later said the song "really gave a blood transfusion to my career. But it wasn't like I went from playing to five people to 5,000 people. It was just a real influx of energy." The success caused Mann stress, as she felt pressure to capitalize on it and tour heavily.

=== 1999–2001: Bachelor No. 2 and label independence ===
I can put out what I consider good music, with the players I want, the songs I want, the sequence I want, the artwork I want and I don't have to confer with a bunch of idiots about what they think, which is always wrong, and then to have to do this dance where you're trying to get them to think that they thought of the idea. It's just an embarrassing waste of your time. When I was on a major record label, nothing ever got done.

— Mann on independence from major record labels (2008)

Mann took more control over the production of her third album, Bachelor No. 2. It includes Mann's second collaboration with Elvis Costello, "The Fall of the World's Own Optimist". Geffen refused to release the album, feeling it contained no hit singles. In response, Mann sold homemade EPs of her new music on tour in 1999, which she described as a "DIY fuck-you-record-company-I'm-selling-it-myself move". Mann said the Geffen managers "believed that with a bit of expert tinkering I could be turned into Avril Lavigne". Instead, she accepted an offer from Geffen to leave her contract, deciding to be "in charge of her own destiny".

In 1999, Mann and Hausman formed their own label, SuperEgo Records. With Mann's husband, the songwriter Michael Penn, they also established United Musicians, a collective working outside the major label system. Using the money earned through royalties from Magnolia, Mann bought the Bachelor No. 2 masters from Geffen. She sold 25,000 copies of the album via mail order from her website, a large amount for an independent artist. After she secured a distribution deal, Bachelor No. 2 sold 270,000 copies, outperforming I'm with Stupid. Bachelor No. 2 became the 28th-best-reviewed album of the decade, according to the aggregation website Metacritic. The success established Mann as a career artist who could work outside of the major label system.

In 2000, Mann, Penn and the comedian Patton Oswalt performed together on the Acoustic Vaudeville tour. In 2001, Mann sued Universal Music over the release of a greatest-hits compilation, The Ultimate Collection, which she had not authorized and considered "substandard and misleading". The Boston Globe characterized the lawsuit as one of several challenges to major labels by female musicians that year, including Courtney Love and the Dixie Chicks. That year, Mann was a judge at the inaugural Independent Music Awards, an award for promoting independent musicians. She judged the awards again in 2011.

=== 2002—2004: Lost in Space and Live at St. Ann's Warehouse ===
Following the success of Magnolia and Bachelor No. 2, Mann had a mental breakdown and entered a period of depression. She also had intrusive thoughts resulting from an accident when the car of a drunk driver flipped her tour bus. In 2002, she entered the Sierra Tucson rehabilitation center with anxiety and depression, and PTSD triggered by her kidnapping as a child.

Mann referenced her health problems obliquely in her fourth album, Lost in Space, released in August 2002. Paste described it as "another marvelous collection of Mann's intimate portraits of lost love and broken people, all set to a wry pop soundtrack that often lilts at the precise moment that one would expect dour melancholy".

In November 2004, Mann released Live at St. Ann's Warehouse, a live album recorded in Brooklyn, New York City. That year, she appeared in the TV series Buffy the Vampire Slayer, performing "This Is How It Goes" and "Pavlov's Bell", and on The West Wing, performing a cover of James Taylor's "Shed a Little Light". Mann sang on "That's Me Trying", cowritten and produced by Ben Folds, from William Shatner's 2004 album Has Been.

=== 2005–2007: The Forgotten Arm and One More Drifter in the Snow ===
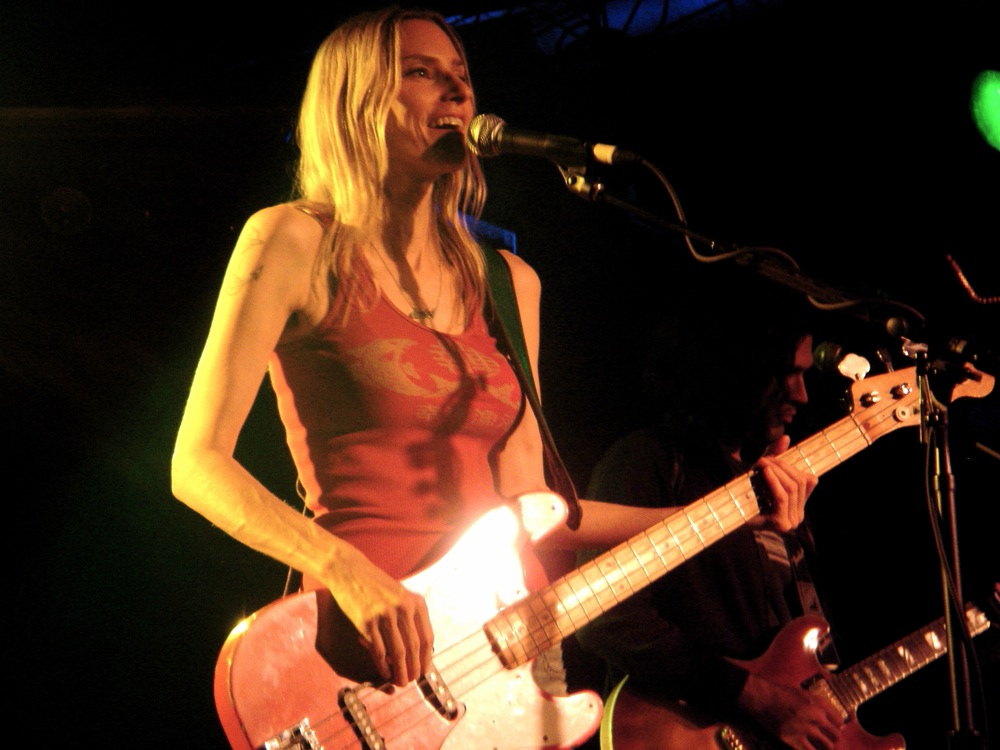
Mann in concert in Solana Beach, California, 2005

In May 2005, Mann released The Forgotten Arm, a concept album set in the 1970s about two lovers who go on the run. It was produced by Joe Henry and recorded mostly live in the studio. The album artwork won a Grammy Award for Best Recording Package. Though The Forgotten Arm received generally positive reviews, the AV Club felt Mann's work was becoming formulaic.

In October 2006, Mann released One More Drifter in the Snow, a Christmas album featuring covers and new songs. It was the first of several Mann albums produced by her bassist, Paul Bryan. Mann said she did not enjoy Christmas songs that use modern genres, and instead drew inspiration from classic Christmas records by Bing Crosby, Frank Sinatra, Peggy Lee and the Vince Guaraldi Trio.

That year, Mann began an annual tradition of playing Christmas shows combining music and comedy. Guests have included Oswalt, Jeff Goldblum, Grant-Lee Phillips, Nellie McKay and Rich Sommer. Mann described it as a "Christmas show for people who don't really like Christmas". In 2007, Mann contributed two original songs, "The Great Beyond" and "At the Edge of the World", to the film Arctic Tale, and sang on "Unforgiven" from John Doe's album A Year in the Wilderness.

=== 2008—2012: @#%&*! Smilers and Charmer ===
In June 2008, Mann released her seventh album, @#%&*! Smilers. It features minimal electric guitar and an emphasis on keyboards. It debuted on the Billboard 200 at number 32 and on the Top Independent Albums chart at number 2. @#%&*! Smilers received mostly positive reviews, with AllMusic writing that it "pops with color, something that gives it an immediacy that's rare for an artist known for songs that subtly worm their way into the subconscious ... Smilers grabs a listener, never making him or her work at learning the record, as there are both big pop hooks and a rich sonic sheen." The artwork, by Gary Taxali, was nominated for the Grammy Award for Best Recording Package.

In May 2011, Mann performed for President Barack Obama and Michelle Obama at a poetry seminar at the White House. She also appeared in a sketch for the Independent Film Channel series Portlandia. Mann played herself as a cleaner, explaining that she needs the second job to support herself.

In 2012, Mann released her eighth solo album, Charmer, comprising songs based on the theme that personal charm should not always be trusted. One song, "Crazytown", is about an alcoholic "manic pixie dream girl". Two singles were released: "Charmer", with a video directed by Tom Scharpling, and "Labrador", with a video featuring the actor Jon Hamm and references to Mann's music videos with 'Til Tuesday. In the same year, Mann contributed vocals to Steve Vai's album The Story of Light on "No More Amsterdam" and recorded the song "Two Horses" for the soundtrack of the film Tim and Eric's Billion Dollar Movie. Mann sang backing vocals on the 2013 Heidecker & Wood album Some Things Never Stay the Same.

=== 2013—2019: the Both and Mental Illness ===
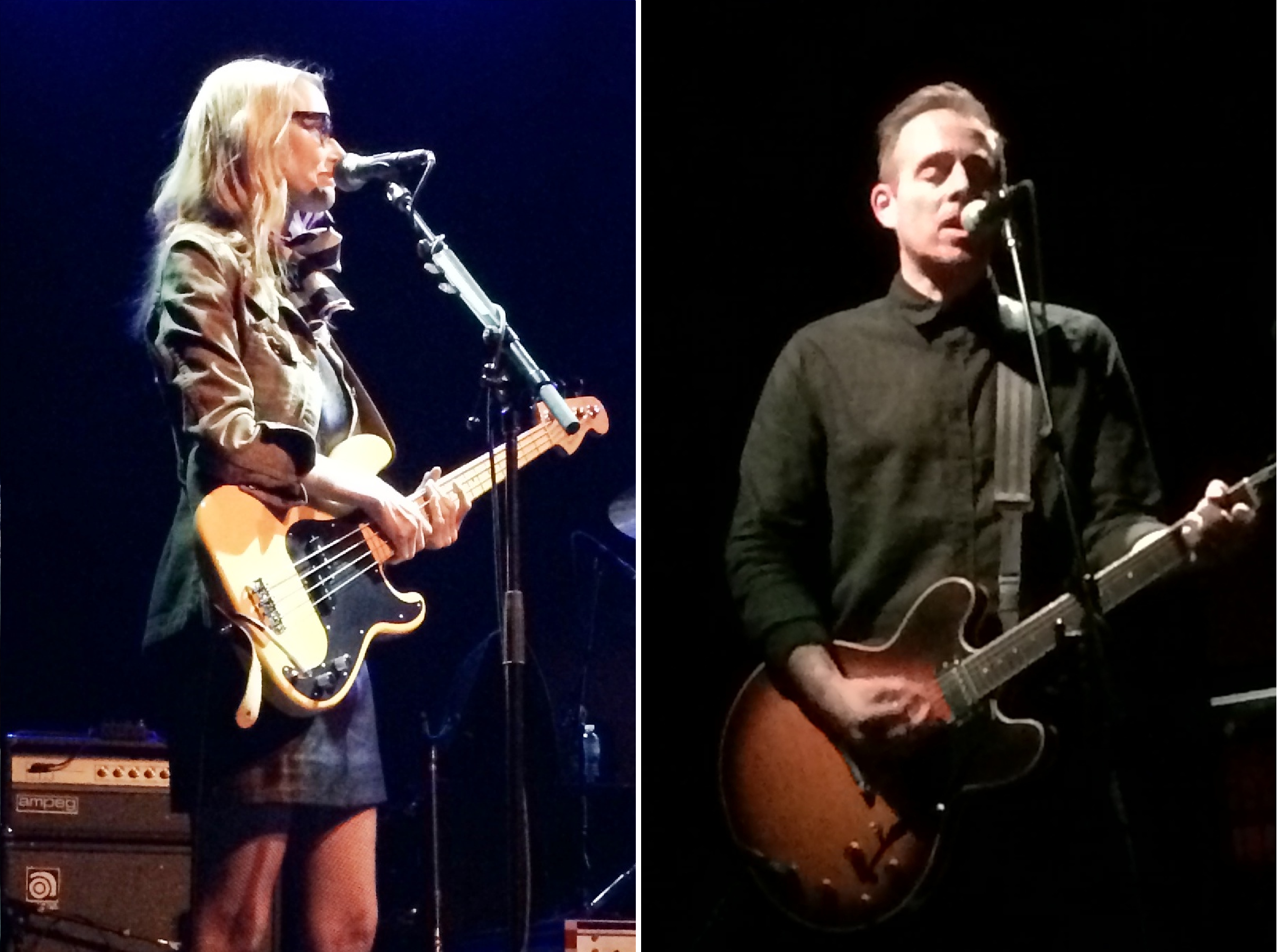
Mann with Ted Leo as the Both in Philadelphia, 2014

In 2012, Mann recorded an episode of the music series From the Basement. In 2013, she appeared on the Ivan & Alyosha album All the Times We Had. That February, she and Ted Leo formed a duo, the Both, and performed shows in Los Angeles and San Francisco. They released an album on SuperEgo in April 2014; Spin described it as "the best thing either artist has ever done". On July 22, Mann filed a lawsuit against MediaNet, saying they were distributing 120 of her songs on an expired license agreement. She attempted to claim as much as $18 million in statutory damages. Mann settled out of court in 2015.

In February 2014, Mann appeared in the Steven Universe episode "Giant Woman" as the voice of Opal. She reprised the role for Steven Universe: The Movie (2019), performing the song "Independent Together" with Leo. Mann contributed a version of Styx's "Come Sail Away" to the 2014 Community episode "Geothermal Escapism". In 2015, Mann and Leo appeared on the talk show Conan performing a song in support of the 2016 US presidential candidate Lincoln Chafee. Mann covered the 1973 Carpenters single "Yesterday Once More" for a 2016 episode of the HBO drama Vinyl. In October 2016, Mann released the song "Can't You Tell" as part of the 30 Days, 30 Songs campaign protesting Donald Trump's presidential campaign.

In March 2017, Mann released her ninth solo album, Mental Illness, a collection of sparse acoustic songs featuring collaborations with the songwriters Jonathan Coulton and John Roderick. The title was suggested by a friend; Mann said it was a "bald, accurate and funny" description of her songwriting themes. Mental Illness won the Grammy Award for Best Folk Album at the 60th Annual Grammy Awards. Coulton joined Mann for some performances on the Mental Illness tour.

That September, Mann contributed the song "Everybody Bleeds" to an episode of the Netflix series Big Mouth. In January 2018, Mann appeared in an episode of the FX series The Assassination of Gianni Versace: American Crime Story as a bar singer, performing the 1984 Cars song "Drive". She also appeared in the sitcom Corporate in the episode "The Pain of Being Alive". In 2019, Mann released an expanded 20th-anniversary reissue of Bachelor No. 2 for Record Store Day. She also hosted a podcast with Leo, The Art of Process, interviewing celebrities including Wyatt Cenac and Rebecca Sugar.

=== 2020s: Queens of the Summer Hotel and Girl, Interrupted ===
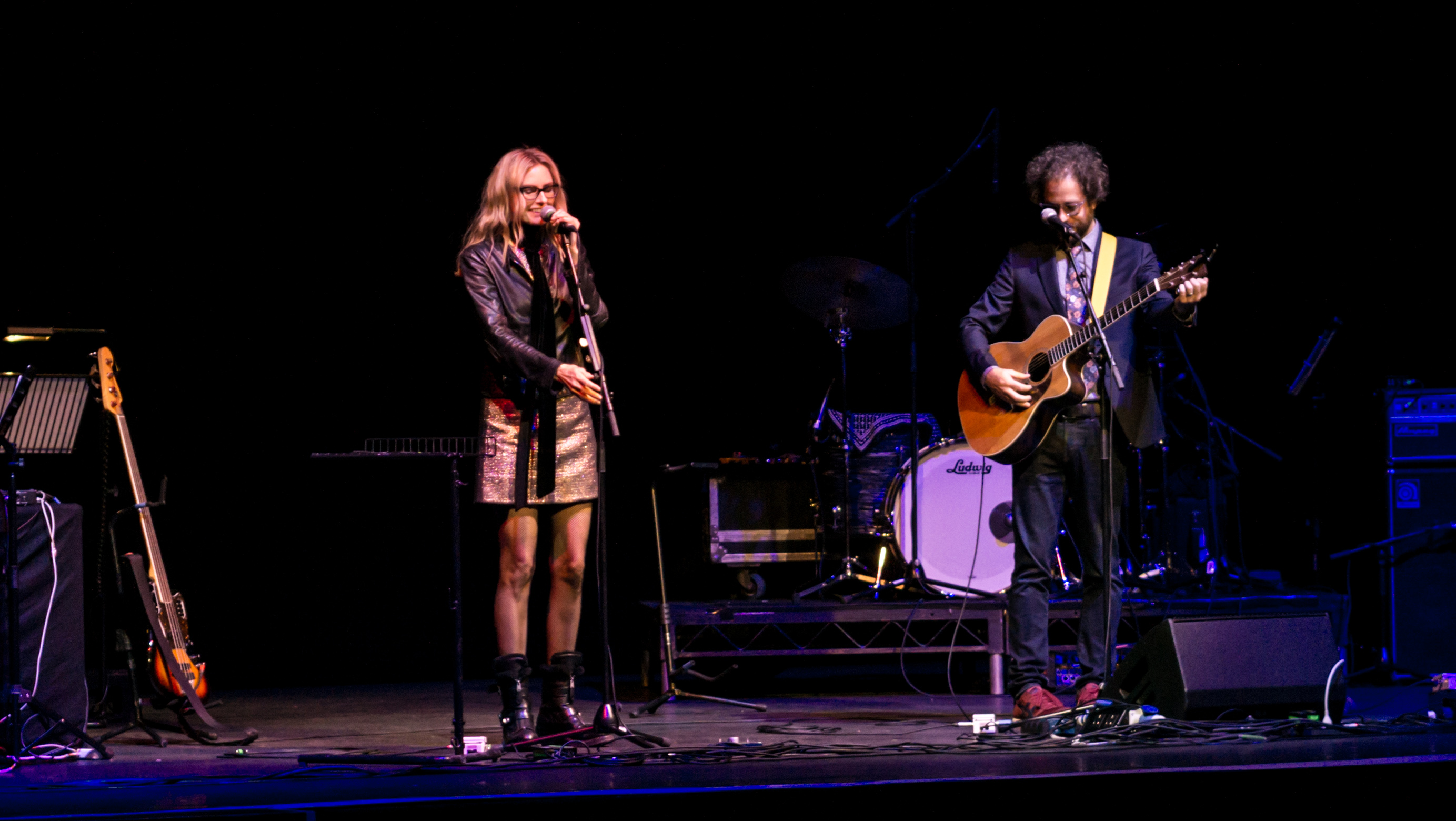
Mann with Jonathan Coulton in London, 2017

In 2020, Mann wrote a song, "Big Deal", for the animated series Central Park, performed by Stanley Tucci. On November 5, 2021, Mann released her tenth album, Queens of the Summer Hotel. It comprises songs written for the musical Girl, Interrupted, based on the 1993 memoir by Susanna Kaysen about her time in a psychiatric hospital. The musical was postponed by the COVID-19 pandemic and opened in New York City in June 2026. Mann was not involved in the final production. Critics for Vulture, The New York Times and The Guardian praised the songs but felt they were not effectively integrated into the narrative.

Mann sang on Susanna Hoffs' cover of the 1971 Badfinger song "Name of the Game", released on Hoffs' 2021 album Bright Lights. In January 2022, Mann began posting autobiographical comics on Instagram. She said that making comics was similar to songwriting: "Having a short amount of time to make a point or to tell a little story ... It's by necessity very truncated." She described making comics as a "weird, lonely, insular drive-yourself-crazy activity", unlike the communal nature of music. In 2025, Mann said she was working on a graphic memoir, which she expected to take several years.

In April 2022, Mann displayed a series of her paintings, You Could Have Been a Roosevelt, at City Winery, Manhattan. The paintings are portraits of "the ten worst US presidents" and a selection of first ladies. Mann created them after promising her friend, the politician Antony Blinken, a painting for his White House office. She said that Blinken "declined to have a portrait of Millard Fillmore on his wall, and I can't say I blame him". On May 22, Mann led a lineup of women performers at the Novo club in Los Angeles, raising funds for the Magee Women's Institute.

Mann was dropped from a supporting slot on Steely Dan's 2022 tour. The Steely Dan co-founder Donald Fagen denied rumors that he felt a female singer-songwriter would not suit their audience and instead said Mann was not a good musical fit. He apologized, saying he respected Mann and did not realize any commitment had been made. Mann accepted the apology and said it was plausible that Fagen did not know she had been announced for the tour. She covered the Steely Dan song "Brooklyn (Owes the Charmer Under Me)" on tour that year. In January 2023, Mann launched an Audible podcast, Straw into Gold, in which she interviewed artists about the connection between art and trauma.

In January 2025, Mann organized a fundraiser for her longtime producer, Paul Bryan, who lost his home and recording studio in the Palisades Fire. On 6 March, she announced a remastered reissue of Lost in Space, followed by an anniversary tour. On 17 May, Mann reunited with 'Til Tuesday for their first show in 33 years at the Cruel World Festival in Pasadena. She said she enjoyed the challenge of preparing for the performance, and had to relearn the songs as her singing style had changed. Mann contributed vocals to "Alabaster" by the English duo Flyte, released in July, and recorded a cover of the 1971 Carpenters song "Rainy Days and Mondays" for the television series The Chair Company. In June 2026, Mann joined Rush on the opening night of their Fifty Something Tour, singing "Time Stand Still". Mann wrote that she almost refused the invitation as she was suffering from depression, but knew she would have regretted it and enjoyed the experience.

== Songwriting ==
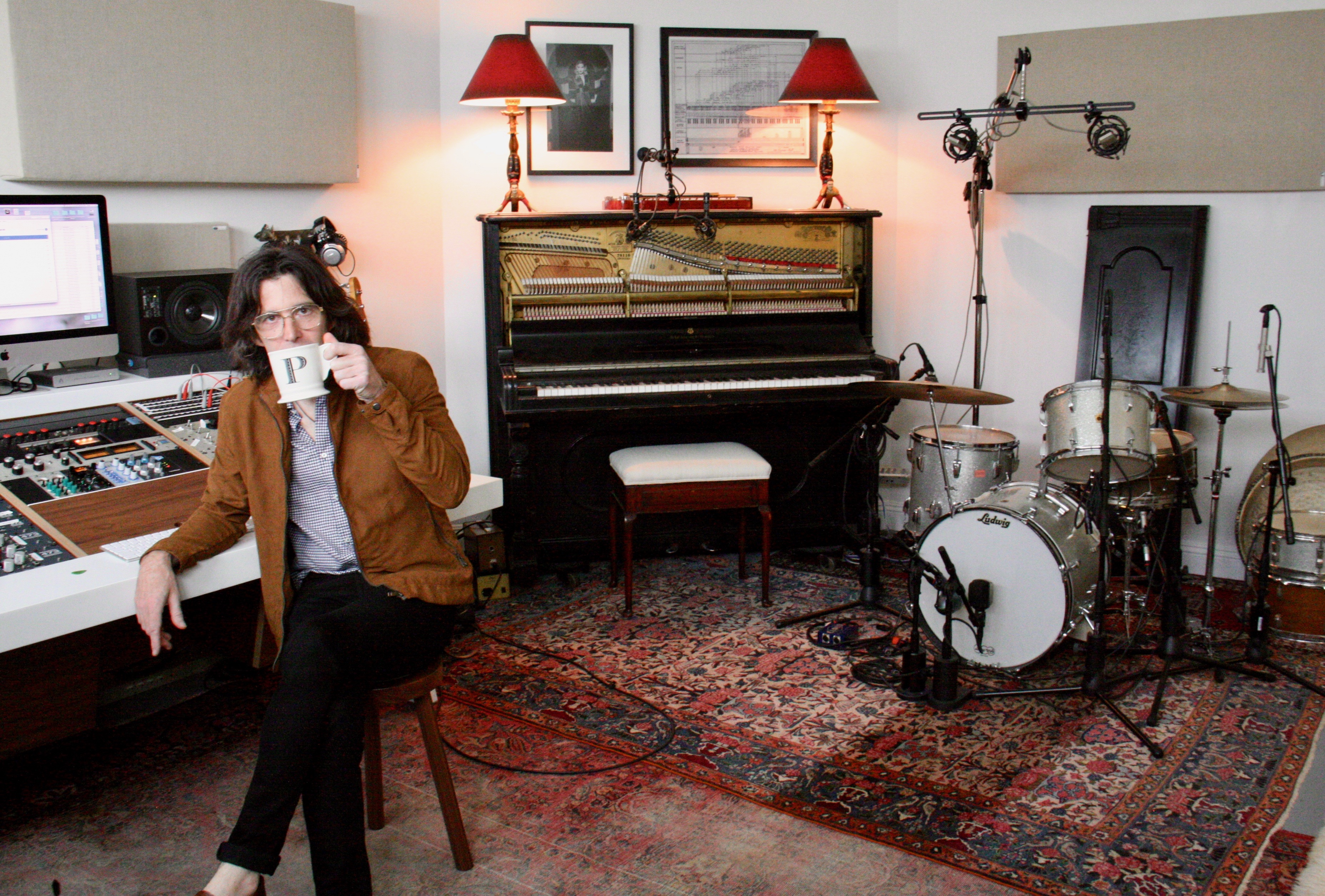
Paul Bryan (pictured in 2017) produced several of Mann's later albums.

Pitchfork characterized Mann's music as "refined guitar pop filled with attuned details and characters more often associated with the best short stories". The journalist Jon Pareles described Mann as a "formalist of pop songwriting" whose "verses, choruses and bridges arrive in their proper places and melodies trace a measured, symmetrical rise and fall". The New York Times critic Ben Ratliff wrote of Mann's "urbane pop songs, melodically rich and full of well-worn sayings fitted into spiky couplets". Mann said songwriting was "an exercise in order... To attempt to describe something — to make connections, to put pieces together, to try to sum up complicated ideas in a three-and-a-half minute song — that's trying to put chaos in order for me."

Mann played the bass guitar with the Young Snakes, 'Til Tuesday and the Both. For her own shows, she generally plays acoustic guitar, finding it "more convenient". On her first solo albums, Mann and the producer Jon Brion created a sound the Stereogum writer Doug Bleggi called "LA alternative". The style is associated with turn-of-the-century alternative acts such as Fiona Apple, Elliott Smith, Rufus Wainwright, and Eels, all of whom worked with Brion in the 1990s. Several of Mann's later albums were produced by Paul Bryan.

In the 1990s, Mann came under pressure from her record company, Geffen, to write hit singles, which she found frustrating. When she attempted to write catchy and lyrically accessible songs, she became bored and could not finish them. She felt that record companies attempted to "remove everything that's interesting" from her songs, and concluded: "My music is not going to sell outside a certain audience, so why not leave it alone so you don't alienate the people who actually like it?" Mann said she was not interested in being a pop star, and said: "It takes a special skill to be a big star and I just don't have those skills, so there isn't much point in me pretending."

=== Lyrics ===
Mann is noted for her sharp and literate lyrics. She said she admires precision in lyrics and that she liked rhymes that are "perfect and interesting". She explores dark subjects such as mental illness and suicide, and writes about underdog characters who are lost, lonely or exist outside of society. In Pitchfork, Chris Dahlen wrote of Mann's skill in writing about dark subjects without self-pity, and in using specific imagery to carry general meanings. Another Pitchfork writer, Eric Torres, attributed Mann's penchant for underdog characters to her struggles in the music industry. In Paste, Dave Sims wrote that "Mann's first-person protagonists invariably find themselves on the raw end of a doomed romance, ducking out under a smokescreen of half-mumbled mea culpas and a cloud of fatalism".

Mann combines sad music and themes with humorous or sarcastic lyrics to create the sense of a narrator trying to hide their feelings. She felt this was sadder than simply stating the feelings directly. She said: "I'm sure I'm the only person who thinks any lines or any moments are funny, but that's usually because they're the most accurate and bleak ones." In the New York Times, Nate Chinen wrote that "the sugarcoated poison pill is a reliable device for Aimee Mann, a singer-songwriter given to ravaging implication and dispassionate affect". Paul Thomas Anderson wrote that Mann was "the great articulator of the biggest things we think about: 'How can anyone love me?' 'Why the hell would anyone love me?' and the old favorite 'Why would I love anyone when all it means is torture?'" Many of the lyrics on Mann's 1990s albums express her frustration with her record label, Geffen.

=== Influences ===
Mann said she was mainly influenced by "classic" 1970s chord progressions and melodies. Elton John was the artist who was most important to her at an early age: "His melody, the chords, his singing ... There was something in the DNA of his melodic structure that I picked up on later and was influenced by."

Mann said Steely Dan was "the one band that I 100% love, with no reservations", and cited Fiona Apple, Leonard Cohen, Stephen Sondheim and Jimmy Webb as artists she admires. The music of Elliott Smith affirmed to her that it was acceptable to write songs about personal or dark subjects. Mann said that American Songbook standards and ragtime had "resonance" for her. Older British bands such as the Kinks, the Zombies and Squeeze influenced her debut album, Whatever.

== Reception ==
Writing for the New Yorker in 2000, the novelist Nick Hornby wrote that Mann was "a fine, occasionally brilliant singer-songwriter, nothing more, nothing less, and this plainness of purpose has cost her dearly over the last fifteen, mostly calamitous, years". He said she had not found wider success as she did not meet expectations for female singer-songwriters: "She is not one of the lads, like Sheryl Crow; she is outspoken rather than introspective, which means that she has little in common with the Carole King school; and she is much too grown-up and circumspect to want to bare her pain in the way that Tori Amos and Fiona Apple do." Hornby noted that some found Mann's "self-righteous sense of grievance" irritating, such as the author Greil Marcus, who wrote that she was "still whining after all these years". Hornby responded that pop music could express any mood and asked: "Who doesn't feel like whining sometimes?"

In 2004, the Stylus critic Ryan Hardy wrote that Mann may be the archetypal "critically acclaimed, commercially unsuccessful singer-songwriter with a cult following". He wrote that, like musicians such as Lucinda Williams, Neil Finn and Ron Sexsmith, she had come close to major success, had problems with the record industry and made a living despite a lack of public profile or radio play thanks to her devoted fanbase. In Pitchfork, Judy Berman described Mann as "a pop flavor of the week who reinvented herself as a singer-songwriter; a folk-rock traditionalist who refused to posture her way into a self-consciously edgy alternative idiom; a woman whose persona isn't seductive or enraged so much as pensive and, at times, embittered; an artist in a youth-obsessed industry who started doing her best work sometime in her late 30s".

In 2006, Paste named Mann the 54th-greatest living songwriter, and NPR named her among the ten greatest living songwriters. Robin Hilton of NPR wrote that she was "vastly underrated" and had "a real gift for piercing the heart of something, revealing instead of telling and wrapping it all up in inspired melodies".

== Personal life ==
According to the musician Al Jourgensen of the band Ministry, he and Mann had a brief "dysfunctional" romance in Boston in the 1970s or 1980s. Mann wrote "No More Crying" about their relationship. Mann had a two-year relationship with the singer-songwriter Jules Shear, and their breakup influenced the final 'Til Tuesday album, Everything's Different Now (1988). Mann dated the 'Til Tuesday drummer Michael Hausman; after they separated, they remained friends and Hausman became her manager. The actor and comedian Dave Foley said Mann wrote "Save Me" about him while they were in a relationship.

In 1993, while Mann was recording Whatever, she met the songwriter Michael Penn, the brother of the actors Sean Penn and Chris Penn. They married in 1997 and live in Los Angeles. Mann said about Penn: "He's really a top-rated songwriter for me, and thank God, because how sad is it if you were with another singer-songwriter and you're like, 'Yeah, whatever, it's not my kind of thing'?" In 2005, Mann's main interest outside music was boxing. She said: "When you realise that you can take a punch, it's an amazing thing. I've learnt something important: getting hit is not that bad."

In 2008, Mann said she had attended Al-Anon, a support group for the families and friends of alcoholics, to deal with the exhaustion she felt from trying to help addicts she knew. In 2020, she developed a nervous system disorder that gave her tinnitus, migraines, nausea and dizziness and prevented her from listening to music for a year. She believed the disorder was triggered by a combination of childhood trauma and the stress of the COVID-19 pandemic. Mann holds left-wing political views.

== Discography ==
- Whatever (1993)
- I'm with Stupid (1995)
- Bachelor No. 2 or, the Last Remains of the Dodo (2000)
- Lost in Space (2002)
- The Forgotten Arm (2005)
- One More Drifter in the Snow (2006)
- @#%&*! Smilers (2008)
- Charmer (2012)
- Mental Illness (2017)
- Queens of the Summer Hotel (2021)

== Awards and nominations ==
Grammy Awards

Year	Nominee / work	Award	Result
2001	Magnolia	Best Compilation Soundtrack for Visual Media	Nominated
2001	"Save Me"	Best Song Written for Visual Media	Nominated
2001	"Save Me"	Best Female Pop Vocal Performance	Nominated
2006	The Forgotten Arm	Best Recording Package	Won
2009	Fucking Smilers	Best Boxed or Special Limited Edition Package	Nominated
2018	Mental Illness	Best Folk Album	Won

Other awards

Year	Awards	Work	Category	Result
1985	American Video Awards	"Voices Carry"	Best Female Performance	Won
2000	Academy Awards	"Save Me"	Best Original Song	Nominated
2000	Golden Globe Awards	"Save Me"	Best Original Song	Nominated
2000	Las Vegas Film Critics Society Awards	"Save Me"	Best Original Song	Nominated
2000	Online Film & Television Association	"Save Me"	Best Original Song	Nominated
2000	Satellite Awards	"Save Me"	Best Original Song	Nominated
2000	MTV Video Music Awards	"Save Me"	Best Video from a Film	Nominated
2000	MTV Video Music Awards	"Save Me"	Best Editing	Won
2000	My VH1 Music Awards	Herself	Best-Kept Secret	Nominated
2006	PLUG Awards	The Forgotten Arm	Album Art/Packaging of the Year	Nominated
2013	A2IM Libera Awards	Charmer	Creative Packaging Award	Nominated
2018	A2IM Libera Awards	Mental Illness	Best American Roots & Folk Album	Won
2022	Denmark GAFFA Awards	Herself	Best Foreign Solo Act	Pending
2022	Denmark GAFFA Awards	Queens of the Summer Hotel	Best Foreign Album	Pending
