= Wege =

Wege is a form of weg, which means way in several Germanic languages.

Wege of WEGE may refer to

- Wege (surname), people with the name
- WEGE, radio station in Lima, Ohio
- Wege zum Glück, a German telenovela
  - Bianca – Wege zum Glück
  - Julia – Wege zum Glück
- Bereitet die Wege, bereitet die Bahn, BWV 132, a church cantata by Johann Sebastian Bach
