= Dick Wingate =

American music executive

- Born: Richard Wingate; April 6, 1952 (age 74); New Haven, Connecticut, US
- Education: Brown University
- Occupations: President, Artist & Entertainment Services, Crowdmix North America; President of BHi Music Group; Board member of Big House Publishing; Principal of Dev Advisors

Dick Wingate (born April 6, 1952, in New Haven, Connecticut) is an American music industry and digital entertainment executive, currently serving as principal of DEV Advisors. Wingate is also a board member and partner in Big House Music Publishing, as well as an affiliate of NARAS (Grammys).

== Early days ==
As a teenager, Wingate frequently went to concerts including Cream, the Beach Boys, the Jeff Beck Group featuring Rod Stewart, the Rolling Stones and a Doors concert in New Haven in which Jim Morrison was arrested on stage in December 1967. After Wingate graduated from Hopkins School in 1970, he enrolled as a student at Brown University in Providence, Rhode Island. He then worked at WBRU-FM, starting out as a DJ and soon progressing to music director in 1972 and to program director in 1973. Wingate met Bruce Springsteen, who visited the station. Only a few years later he would become his product manager.

In 1974, after graduating, Wingate moved to New York City as director of East Coast Promotions / Operations for independent record label Chess / Janus Records and worked with the artists Al Stewart, Camel, Caravan and Muddy Waters. He also held a weekend DJ slot at WPLR-FM in New Haven, where he first premiered "Born to Run" to southern Connecticut listeners.

== Record labels: Columbia, Epic and PolyGram ==
In late 1975, Wingate moved to Columbia Records as a product manager. During his tenure at Columbia, he product managed Springsteen's Darkness on the Edge of Town, Pink Floyd – Animals, David Gilmour's first solo LP, Nick Lowe's Pure Pop for Now People, Peter Tosh's Legalize It and Equal Rights albums and the three album initial marketing campaign for Elvis Costello's My Aim Is True, This Year's Model and Armed Forces. His relationship with Springsteen was documented in Dave Marsh's authorized biography, Born to Run, including a photograph of Springsteen and Wingate at the printing press as the covers of Darkness on the Edge of Town were being printed.

He moved to Epic Records in 1979 as director of talent acquisition. His first signing was the studio creation Flash and the Pan (Harry Vanda and George Young of Easybeats fame) from Australia which went on to sell over 150,000 copies. He then completed a label licensing agreement with Stiff Records and released British new wave artists Ian Dury and the Blockheads, Lene Lovich, Wreckless Eric and Ian Gomm. Soon after, he had a number one hit single and first gold album with Eddy Grant's "Electric Avenue". His other notable signings included Face to Face who had a top 20 pop single "10-9-8"; Garland Jeffreys whose Escape Artist album he executive produced (Time magazine named it one of the year's 10 best records in 1981); and most notably 'Til Tuesday's Voices Carry album (1985) which he executive produced, and included a top 10 pop single ("Voices Carry") and won the MTV Video Music Award for Best New Artist 1985.

In 1986, Dick Asher, the new president/CEO of PolyGram Records hired Wingate as senior VP of artists and repertoire, where he had responsibility for all US releases for both domestic and international artists. During his tenure, successes included the development of Bon Jovi from Gold (500K) unit sales to 10× Platinum on Slippery When Wet and 7 million on New Jersey; multi-platinum success with Cinderella's Night Songs and Long Cold Winter, John Mellencamp; the signing of Robert Cray (platinum album and Grammy), LA Guns, the Fat Boys, Ivan Neville and Mother Love Bone (which went on to become Pearl Jam). In late 1989, Wingate left PolyGram and by early 1990 so had most of the senior management staff including CEO Dick Asher, head of marketing Jim Urie and GM Bob Jamieson.

== Transition to technology ==
In 1990, Wingate began consulting InTouch Group of San Francisco, California, and became VP of Market and Business Development. InTouch developed the i-Station which married music previewing with interactive technology, database management and direct marketing. He acquired music catalogs from over 250 labels, developed and managed the database, helped negotiate an agreement with Billboard magazine to feature interactive Billboard music charts on the i-Station, and organized and conducted demonstration meetings for label executives, investors, market researchers, retailers, press and analysts. The systems proved prohibitively expensive to produce and maintain and eventually the company went into re-organization in February 1996. Wingate left in mid-1994 to return to Arista.

=== Return to Arista ===
Wingate returned to the record label Arista Records in June 1994 as Senior VP of Marketing to work directly for Clive Davis. At Arista over the next two years he promoted artists including TLC, The Notorious B.I.G., Sarah McLachlan, Annie Lennox, Toni Braxton, Boys on the Side's soundtrack, Real McCoy, Crash Test Dummies, Barry Manilow, Kenny G and Ace of Base.

In 1996, he moved to Arista's corporate parent, BMG North America as New Media Consultant, helping to develop BMG's online & internet strategy. At BMG, he completed a deal with AOL Liquid Audio became a consulting client in 1997, along with music database provider Muze and EMCI.

=== Liquid Audio ===
Liquid Audio had developed one of the earliest standards for streaming and downloading audio on the Internet. CEO and Co-founder Gerry Kearby hired Wingate full-time as Senior VP of Content Development in July 1998. Over the next 3 years, he was responsible for managing music business development, label relations, affiliate management and content programming. He completed commercial licensing deals (prior to iTunes) with Universal Music Group, Warner Music Group, EMI Music, BMG Music and over 1000 independent record labels, thus building a significant digital music distribution inventory; and managed a network of retail and lifestyle websites that utilized Liquid Audio's technology or music catalogue including Amazon.com, Best Buy, CDNow, Barnes & Noble, Billboard, Hard Rock Café, Sam Goody, Music Boulevard and Tower Records. Liquid Audio went public with an IPO in 1999 and in January 2003, it was acquired by Anderson Media/Anderson Merchandisers During these years Wingate was a speaker at conferences including Jupiter Plug-In, Webnoize, CMJ, Midem, Bear Stearns, Credit Suisse, Business Week, SXSW, Interactive Music Expo and Gavin conferences. Wingate negotiated exclusive downloads from a live PBS performance by Dave Matthews Band, the first time music from a nationally known artist was made available for purchase exclusively on the Internet.

While at Liquid Audio he was also the subject of a feature article in The New York Times Sunday Business section ("A Watchdog for Online Music" July 5, 2000), a front page Los Angeles Times article, Entertainment Weekly and Hits magazine, and was quoted in The Wall Street Journal, Time, USA Today, The New York Times Magazine and many times in Billboard. In 2000 he was selected as a representative of NYC's Silicon Alley to meet President and Mrs. Clinton and five U.S. senators.

In 2004 and 2005 Wingate served as president, Content & Programming for BPOD Networks, also known as Digital Transaction Machines Inc., an interactive systems provider for in-store delivery of digital products for clients including McDonald's and 7-Eleven. DTM's systems enabled consumers to build playlists, burn custom CDs and get ringtones sent to their handsets.

=== Mobile media ===
In 2006, Wingate joined Nellymoser Inc. as president, media development & chief content officer. At Nellymoser, Wingate worked in mobile media delivery, mobile application development and streaming music to cell phones. He worked with ABC, Sony/BMG, Warner Music Group and MTV on application development. Nellymoser's Warner Music Jukebox application was the first music streaming on-demand service on any US carrier (Sprint). As CCO, he was responsible for direct licensing of content and for content partnerships and programming for Nellymoser's own mobile music services which were offered on wireless service providers AT&T, Virgin Mobile and Alltel. In 2008, Wingate left Nellymoser but continued consulting the company as a Digital Media Consultant along with Myxer, Nimbit, Music180.com, Cava Capital and GyPSii.

== TAG Strategic ==
Wingate joined Ted Cohen's TAG Strategic in middle of 2009 as General Manager, East Coast Business Development.

== DEV Advisors/Digital Entertainment Ventures ==
In May 2012, Wingate created a partnership with Digital Entertainment Ventures (DEV) as Principal DEV Advisor.

== Big House Publishing ==
In November 2013, Wingate joined Christian Cedras & Krista Retto to launch to launch Big House Publishing, an independent music publishing and artist development company in New York City.

== Crowdmix ==
In October 2015, Wingate joined UK-based Crowdmix.me as president, Artist & Entertainment Services, North America. The role, based in New York, saw him focus on Crowdmix's strategic collaboration with music industry stakeholders, including artists, record labels and marketers. Wingate was appointed by Rob Wells, Crowdmix's Global Commercial Officer and CEO the Americas. Crowdmix was a music-centric social media application developer.

== DEV Advisors ==
In 2017, Wingate re-launched DEV Advisors, a digital entertainment consultancy that provides expertise to service providers, app developers, content owners and investors, with services including business development, partnerships, licensing, artist relations and investment.
