= Babelsberg Studio =

German film studio

Coordinates: 52°23′13″N 13°07′10″E

Studio Babelsberg AG

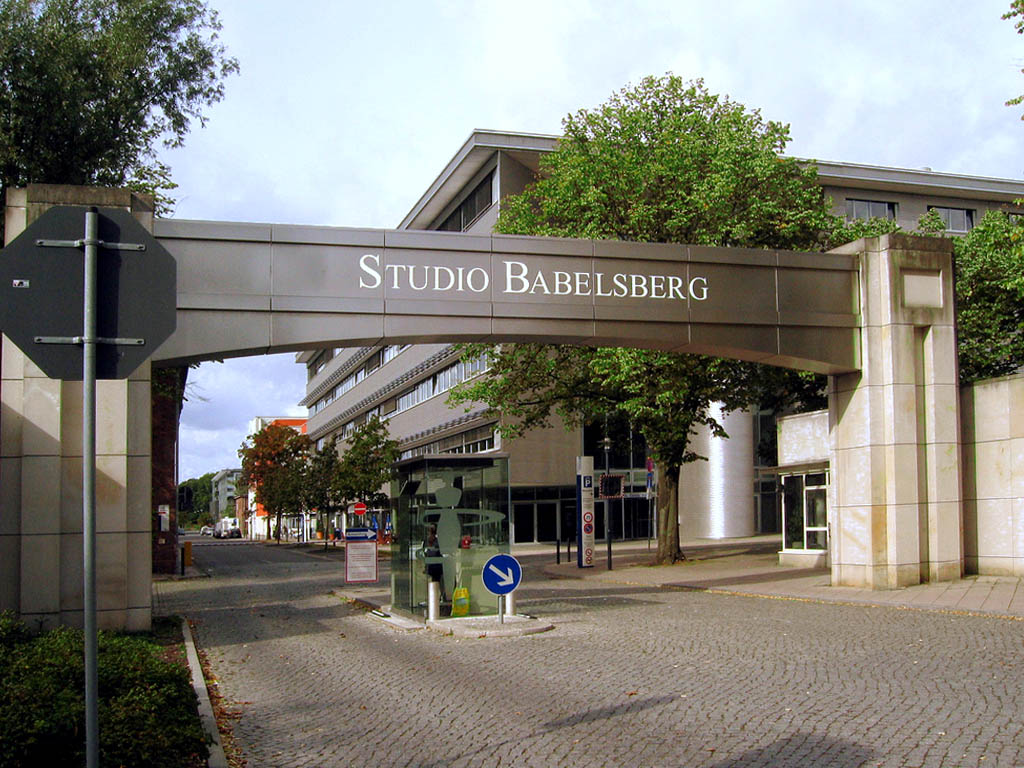
- Type: Private
- Founded: 1912; 114 years ago, in Germany
- Headquarters: Potsdam-Babelsberg, Brandenburg, Germany
- Key people: Carl Woebcken (CEO); Christoph Fisser (board of directors); Marius Schwarz (CFO)
- Owner: TPG Real Estate Partners
- Number of employees: 92 (2017)
- Website: www.studiobabelsberg.com

Babelsberg Film Studio (German: Filmstudio Babelsberg) (also known as Studio Babelsberg), located in Potsdam-Babelsberg outside Berlin, Germany, is the oldest large-scale film studio in the world, producing films since 1912. With a total area of about 460,000 square metres (5,000,000 sq ft) and a studio area of about 25,000 square metres (270,000 sq ft), it is Europe's largest film studio.

Hundreds of films, including Fritz Lang's Metropolis and Josef von Sternberg's The Blue Angel were filmed there. More recent productions include V for Vendetta, Captain America: Civil War, Æon Flux, The Bourne Ultimatum, Valkyrie, Inglourious Basterds, Cloud Atlas, The Grand Budapest Hotel, The Hunger Games, Isle of Dogs and The Matrix Resurrections.

Today, Studio Babelsberg remains operational mainly for feature film productions. It also acts as producer on German productions and co-producer on international high-budget productions. Since January 2022 it has been owned by TPG Real Estate Partners (TREP) and Filmbetriebe Berlin Brandenburg GmbH (FBB), and promoted as part of the platform Cinespace Film Studios.

== History ==
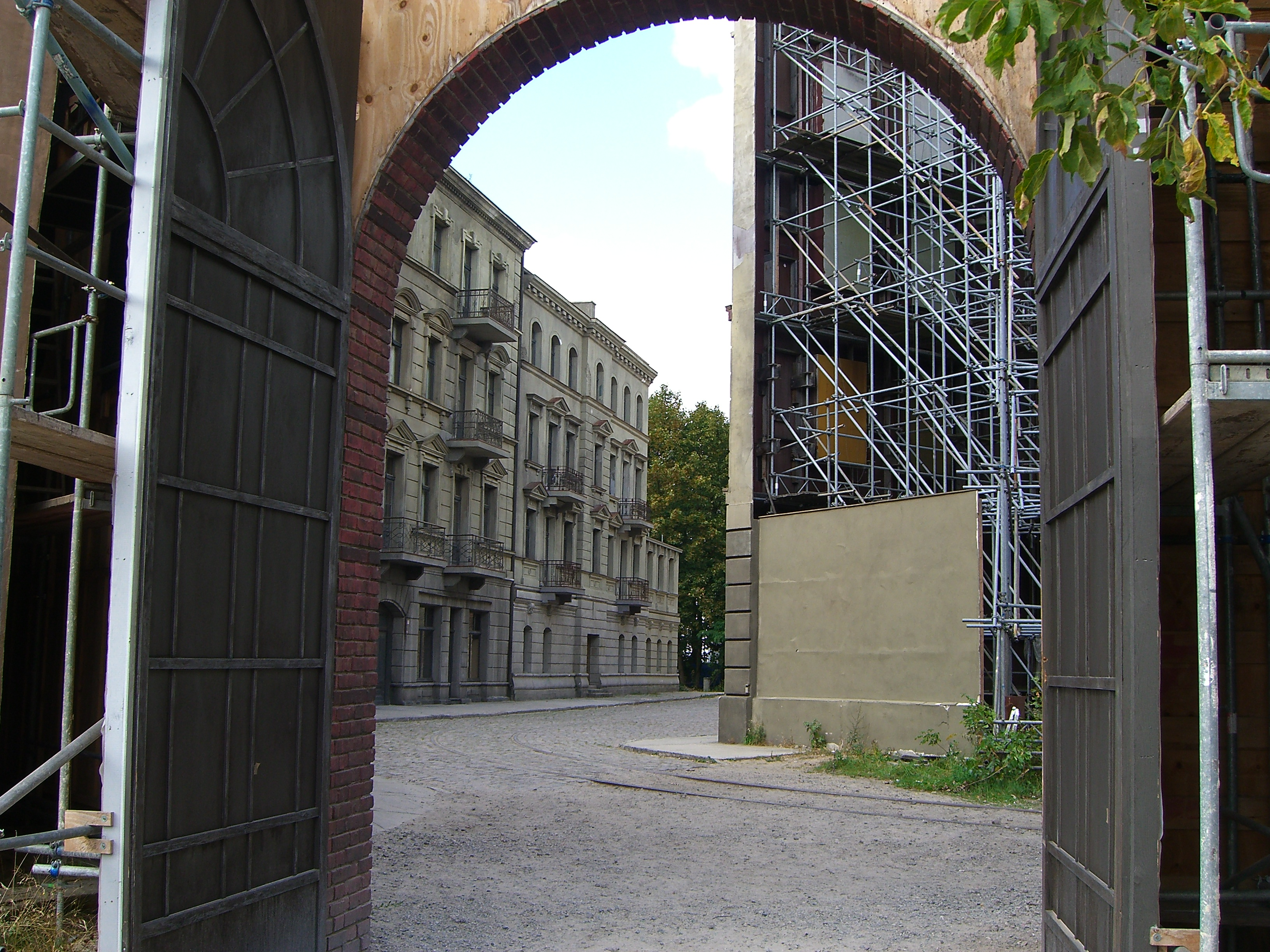
Movie set Berlin at Filmpark Babelsberg, adjacent to the studios

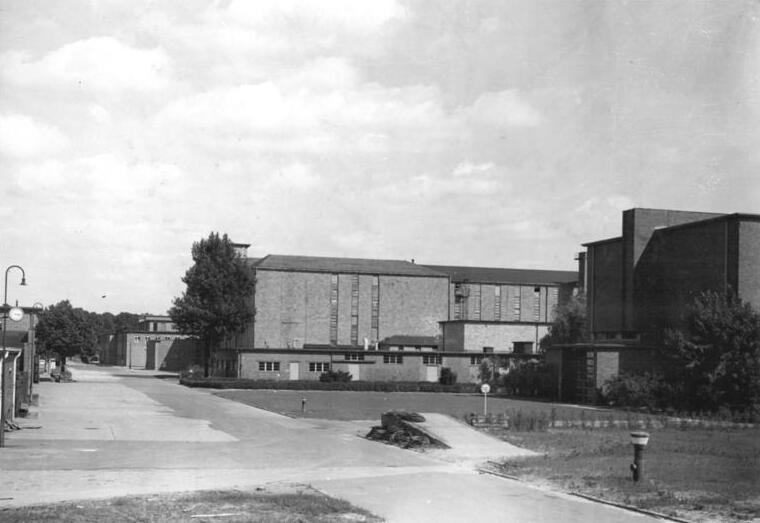
Babelsberg Studios in 1952

In 1911, the film production company Deutsche Bioscope bought the current site in Babelsberg and built its first glasshouse film studio (early studios designed to take advantage of natural light) in Neubabelsberg. The company had been originally formed by Jules Greenbaum in 1899 and incorporated in 1902. As his business increased, Greenbaum made a deal with the chemist Carl Moritz Schleussner of the photochemicals firm Schleussner AG in Frankfurt/Main. Carl Schleussner had been involved since 1896 in producing negative film stock for Röntgen photography soon after its discovery. In February 1908 Carl Schleussner bought a majority share in Deutsche Bioscop as a film manufacturing, duplicating and sales operation, for a two thirds share of 140,000 marks, with one third provided by Jules Greenbaum and his brother Max. Ownership of Deutsche Bioscop was transferred to Schleussner AG and registered on 27 February 1908: Schleussner bought out the Greenbaums' remaining share of Deutsche Bioscop in 1909.

The first filming in Babelsberg began as early as February 1912 for The Dance of Death by Danish director Urban Gad. In 1920 the Deutsche Bioscop Gesellschaft merged with Erich Pommer's Decla-Film GmbH to form "Decla-Bioscop". In 1928, Decla-Bioscop merged with Universum Film AG (Ufa) which had been founded in 1917. This company built the large studio (which is now known as the "Marlene Dietrich Halle") in 1926 for the major film production of Metropolis by Fritz Lang.

The "German Expressionism in film" is closely connected with Babelsberg.

Cameraman Karl Freund invented the so-called "Unchained camera technique" while working on the film The Last Laugh (1924), directed by Friedrich Wilhelm Murnau.

Numerous filmmakers such as Marlene Dietrich, Alfred Hitchcock and Billy Wilder learned at that time in Babelsberg and began their world careers here.

Spaceflight owes director Fritz Lang and the film team of the science fiction silent film Woman in the Moon (1929), completely made in the Babelsberg studios, a famous achievement: the countdown was born in Babelsberg.

The first sound stage in Europe, the "Tonkreuz", was built during 1929 in Babelsberg, to make use of the Tri-Ergon sound-on-film process to which Ufa acquired the rights. Ufa's first successful full-sound film Melodie des Herzens / Melody of the Heart with Willy Fritsch was shot in the "Tonkreuz" and in Hungary in 1929, although this was followed in April 1930 by the premiere of The Blue Angel (which was made at Babelsberg) by Josef von Sternberg, with Marlene Dietrich and Emil Jannings in the main roles.

In the 1930s and 1940s, Babelsberg was famous for its music and revue films, such as Congress Dances (1931), La Habanera (1937), The Woman of My Dreams (1944).

From 1933 to 1945, around 1,000 feature films were made in the studios and on the studio lot. Under the direction of Hitler's propaganda chief Joseph Goebbels, the studio churned out hundreds of films including Leni Riefenstahl's openly propagandistic Triumph of the Will (1935). The virulently anti-Semitic propaganda film Jud Süss (The Jew Süss) (1940), was also made at Babelsberg.

On May 17, 1946, the DEFA (Deutsche Film AG) was established in the Soviet occupation zone of Germany and Babelsberg Studio was made its headquarters the next year. DEFA became the state-owned film production company in East Germany, producing over 800 feature films, including 150 children's films until 1990. In addition, over 600 films were made for television from 1959 to 1990. The DEFA period was honored by a retrospective at the Museum of Modern Art (MOMA) in New York City in 2005.

After the fall of the Berlin Wall, the Treuhand took over the responsibility for the privatisation of the former DEFA. In August 1992, the Treuhandanstalt sold the former DEFA film studios in Babelsberg to the French group Compagnie Générale des Eaux (later absorbed into Vivendi Universal). Over the following 12 years the company invested around €500 million updating the studio's infrastructure.

In July 2004, Vivendi sold Studio Babelsberg to the investment company FBB (Filmbetriebe Berlin Brandenburg GmbH), which has Carl Woebcken and Christoph Fisser as shareholders. In spring of 2005, the restructured studio presented an initial public offering and began trading on the free market.

2007 was the most profitable year since the studio's privatization in 1992 – 12 feature films were shot at Studio Babelsberg, among them Valkyrie with Tom Cruise, The International with Clive Owen and The Reader with Kate Winslet.

In 2008, Studio Babelsberg and Hollywood producer Joel Silver formed a strategic alliance to produce feature films from the Dark Castle production slate at the world's oldest film studio.

International co-productions made in Babelsberg include Quentin Tarantino's Inglourious Basterds (released 2009), Roman Polanski's The Ghost Writer (2010), Brian De Palma's Passion (2012), George Clooney's The Monuments Men (2014), The Hunger Games: Mockingjay (2014) and Captain America: Civil War (2016).

In 2019, the love story Dream Factory conquered the European cinema screens. The starting point is true events: the construction of the Berlin Wall and the closure of the German-German border on August 13, 1961, brings the international co-productions to a close, affects the film studio and is the stroke of fate for the two main characters, a German extra and a French dance double, who are separated by the events. With this, the Babelsberg film studio was working on a part of its own story.

Recent co-productions of Studio Babelsberg include The Matrix Resurrections (2021), Uncharted (2022) and Retribution (2022).

Recent TV series are Babylon Berlin (2016–2022), Dark (2017–2020) and 1899 (2021/2022).

In 2021, the largest permanent virtual production stage in Europe was set up in Studio Babelsberg for the major European Netflix production 1899. The studio is operated by Dark Bay GmbH, which is managed by Baran Bo Odar and Jantje Friese. Netflix and the investment bank of the state of Brandenburg financed the project. In order to raise the necessary funds, Netflix has committed to realizing several projects in the Dark Bay studio in the coming years. The Brandenburg Ministry of Economic Affairs funded the project with around two million euros.

== Notable films shot at Babelsberg Studios ==
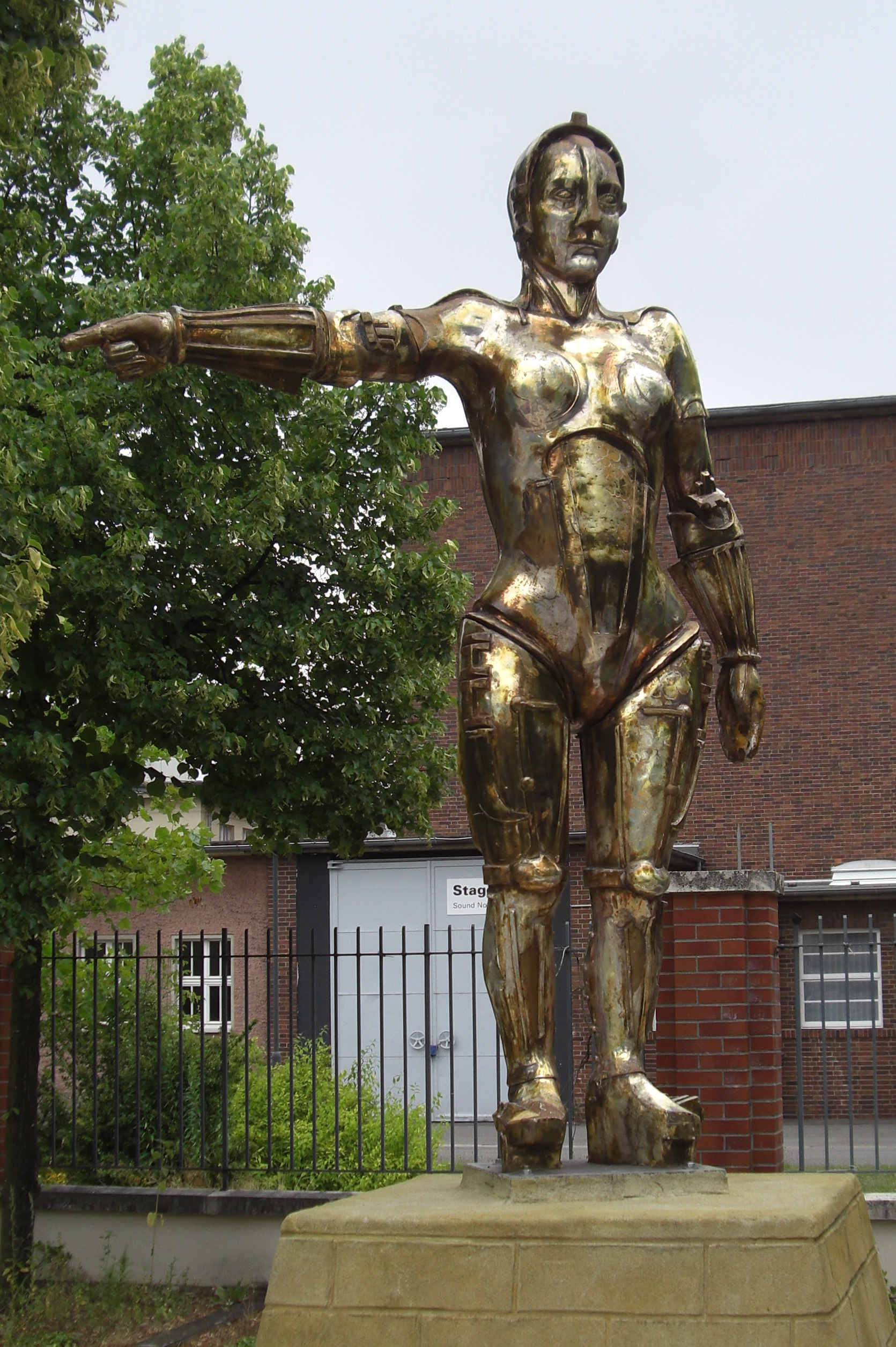
The 1927 film Metropolis was made at Babelsberg. (Photo shows the statue of the film figure Maria in the Filmpark Babelsberg.)

- The Dance of Death (1912)
- The Student of Prague (1913)
- Homunculus (1916)
- Der müde Tod (1921)
- Dr. Mabuse, der Spieler (1922)
- Die Nibelungen (1924)
- Metropolis (1927)
- Spione (1928)
- Frau im Mond (1929)
- Der blaue Engel (1930)
- La Habanera (1937)
- Jud Süß (1940)
- Murderers Among Us (1946)
- Das Beil von Wandsbek (1951)
- Die Geschichte vom kleinen Muck (1953)
- Das singende, klingende Bäumchen (1957)
- Sonnensucher (1958)
- Sterne (1959)
- Karbid und Sauerampfer (1963)
- Nackt unter Wölfen (1963)
- Der geteilte Himmel (1964)
- Die Abenteuer des Werner Holt (1965)
- Spur der Steine (1966)
- Ich war neunzehn (1968)
- Goya – oder der arge Weg der Erkenntnis (1971)
- Die Legende von Paul und Paula (1973)
- Jakob der Lügner (1974)
- Sieben Sommersprossen (de) (1978)
- Solo Sunny (1980)
- Der Aufenthalt (1983)
- The NeverEnding Story III (1994)
- The Passion of Darkly Noon (1995)
- Victory (1996)
- A Couch in New York (1996)
- Sonnenallee (1999)
- Gangster No. 1 (2000)
- Marlene (2000)
- Enemy at the Gates (2001)
- The Pianist (2002)
- Extreme Ops (2002)
- Around the World in 80 Days (2004)
- Kingdom of Heaven (2004)
- The Bourne Supremacy (2004)
- Beyond the Sea (2004)
- The Constant Gardener (2005)
- Flightplan (2005)
- Æon Flux (2005)
- Black Book (2006)
- V for Vendetta (2006)
- The Bourne Ultimatum (2007)
- Die Fälscher (2007)
- Valkyrie (2008)
- Speed Racer (2008)
- The Reader (2008)
- Flammen & Citronen (2008)
- The International (2008)
- Inglourious Basterds (2009)
- Lilly the Witch: The Dragon and the Magic Book (2009)
- Ninja Assassin (2009)
- Pandorum (2009)
- Mr. Nobody (2009)
- The Ghost Writer (2010)
- Unknown (2011)
- Hanna (2011)
- The Three Musketeers (2011)
- Poulet aux prunes (2011)
- Anonymous (2011)
- The Apparition (2012)
- Passion (2012)
- Cloud Atlas (2012)
- Hansel & Gretel: Witch Hunters (2013)
- G.I. Joe: Retaliation (2013)
- The Book Thief (2013)
- La Belle et la Bête (2014)
- The Grand Budapest Hotel (2014)
- The Monuments Men (2014)
- The Hunger Games: Mockingjay – Part 1 (2014)
- The Voices (2015)
- Was heißt hier Ende? (2015)
- Unfinished Business (2015)
- Men & Chicken (2015)
- Bridge of Spies (2015)
- The Hunger Games: Mockingjay – Part 2 (2015)
- Point Break (2015)
- Eddie the Eagle (2016)
- Captain America: Civil War (2016)
- Renegades (2016)
- Atomic Blonde (2017)
- A Cure for Wellness (2017)
- Mute (2018)
- Isle of Dogs (2018)
- Jim Button and Luke the Engine Driver (2018)
- The Silent Revolution (2018)
- Inversion (2018)
- The Girl in the Spider's Web (2018)
- A Hidden Life (2019)
- Charlie's Angels (2019)
- Undine (2020)
- Without Remorse (2021)
- Gunpowder Milkshake (2021)
- The Matrix Resurrections (2021)
- Uncharted (2022)
- Rise of the Teenage Mutant Ninja Turtles: The Movie (2022)
- John Wick: Chapter 4 (2023)
- Retribution (2023)
- The Last Voyage of the Demeter (2023)
- The Hunger Games: The Ballad of Songbirds & Snakes (2023)
- The Phoenician Scheme (2025)
- The Hunger Games: Sunrise on the Reaping (2026)

=== Series ===
- Gute Zeiten, schlechte Zeiten (since 1995)
- Schloss Einstein (1998–2007)
- Bianca – Wege zum Glück (2004–2005)
- Großstadtträume (2000)
- Lexx – The Dark Zone (1997–2002)
- Klinikum Berlin Mitte – Leben in Bereitschaft (2002–2003)
- Tessa – Leben für die Liebe (2005–2006)
- Vera am Mittag (2002–2004)
- Wege zum Glück, initially titled Julia – Wege zum Glück (2005–2008)
- Alisa – Folge deinem Herzen (2008–2010)
- Hanna – Folge deinem Herzen (2010)
- Wege zum Glück – Spuren im Sand (2012)
- Generation War (2012)
- Night Over Berlin (2012)
- Homeland (2015)
- Berlin Station (2015)
- Babylon Berlin (2021–2022)
- Counterpart (2017–2019)
- Dark (2018–2019)
- 1899 (2021)

== Bibliography ==
- Stielke, Sebastian, ed. (2021). 100 Facts about Babelsberg – Cradle of movie and modern media city. bebra Verlag. ISBN 978-3-86124-746-3.
- Bock, Hans-Michael; Bergfelder, Tim, eds. (2009). The Concise Cinegraph: Encyclopedia of German Cinema. Berghahn Books. ISBN 9780857455659.
- Hampicke, Evelyn (1996). "'More than ten lines' Jules Greenbaum. A contribution against forgetting in film history.". Positionen deutscher Filmgeschichte (Positions of German film history) (Discourse-film-8) (in German). Schaudig, Michael (ed.). Munich: Discourse Filmverlag Schaudig & Single. pp. 23–36. ISBN 978-3926372079.
- Hans-Jürgen Tast (ed.) Anton Weber (1904–1979) - Filmarchitekt bei der UFA (Schellerten 2005) ISBN 3-88842-030-X;
