= Happy People: A Year in the Taiga =

- Directed by: Dmitry Vasyukov; Werner Herzog
- Written by: Rudolph Herzog; Werner Herzog
- Produced by: Christoph Fisser; Nick N. Raslan; Yanko Damboulev; Carl Woebcken; Klaus Badelt; Timur Bekmambetov; Werner Herzog
- Narrated by: Werner Herzog
- Edited by: Joe Bini
- Music by: Klaus Badelt
- Production companies: Studio Babelsberg; Celluloid Dreams
- Distributed by: Music Box Films
- Release date: November 2010
- Running time: 94 minutes
- Country: Germany
- Languages: English; Russian
- Box office: $338,987

Happy People: A Year in the Taiga is a 2010 documentary film directed by Dmitry Vasyukov, with English narration written and voiced by Werner Herzog. The film depicts the life of the people in the isolated village of Bakhta (62.464463°N 89.002168°E) at the confluence of the Yenisei and the Bakhta River, in the eastern Siberian taiga. In particular, it focuses on the Russian trappers who hunt for fur animals, such as sable, and fish, depicting their cyclical, self-reliant life dealing with the subarctic climate and geographic isolation. It also briefly looks at the life of native Ket people in the village, and some notable people including an honored WWII veteran. The footage in the documentary was edited from a 2007 4-part television mini-series by Vasyukov.

The original film was conceived by two of the hunters and fishermen, Mikhail Tarkovsky (nephew of famous filmmaker Andrei Tarkovsky who himself worked in the taiga area, inspiring him to become a filmmaker), who has lived and worked in the area since 1981, and Gennady Soloviev, the woodsman who has been there the longest and who taught Mikhail. Both men are featured extensively in the film, Mikhail also being one of the cinematographers. Tarkovsky has written and published numerous short stories about Bakhta and its people and the trappers and natives, which led to the idea for making the film series. Another film based on a novel by Tarkovsky, Frozen Time, has also been produced.

Since the popularity of the TV mini-series, the village of Bakhta has become a tourist spot, with visitors arriving by river boat in the short summer months. Tarkovsky created a museum there that features artifacts and exhibits on the life and work of the trappers, fishermen, boat-builders, craftsmen, and villagers. The museum features a workshop to teach young people practical application on how to live off the land, and to pass down its traditions.

Herzog's shortened English version of the film premiered in Germany in November 2010, had its United States premiere at the 2010 Telluride Film Festival, and the U.S. West Coast premiere on 6 March 2011 at the San Francisco Green Film Festival. It received generally positive reviews from critics.

== Distribution ==
The original 4-part film can be found on Vasyukov's YouTube channel under his Russian name Дмитрий Васюков. It is available with the original Russian narration (no subtitles), as well as an English narrated version with Russian dialogue subtitled in English.

Herzog's shortened English narrated version is available on many streaming services.
