= Mühl =

Mühl or Muehl is a German occupational surname related to the occupation of miller and literally means "mill" (German: Mühle). Notable people with this surname include:

- Charlotte Kemp Muhl (born 1987), American singer, songwriter, writer, model and film director
- Christa Mühl (1947–2019), German director and screenwriter
- Edward Muhl (1907–2001), American businessman and executive
- Erica Muhl (born 1961), American composer and conductor
- Lars Muhl (born 1950), Danish writer, mystic and musician
- Lukas Mühl (born 1997), German professional footballer
- Nika Mühl (born 2001), Croatian basketball player
- Otto Muehl (1925–2013), Austrian artist

== See also ==
- Von der Mühll
