= Jimmy Iovine =

American entrepreneur and former music executive (born 1953)

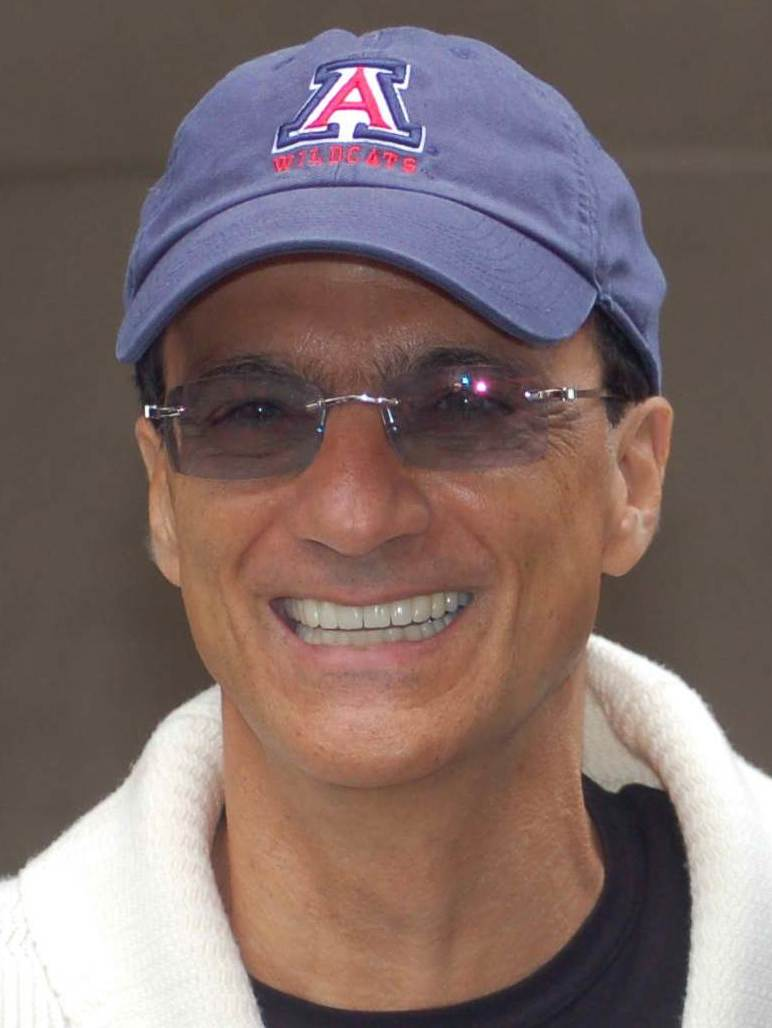
- Iovine in 2012
- Born: James Iovine; March 11, 1953 (age 73); New York City, U.S.
- Occupations: Record executive; entrepreneur; media proprietor
- Years active: 1972–present
- Label: Interscope
- Spouses: Vicki Iovine (m. 1985; div. 2009) Liberty Ross (m. 2016)
- Children: 4

James Iovine (/ˈaɪ.əviːn/ EYE-ə-veen; born March 11, 1953) is an American entrepreneur, former record executive, and media proprietor. He co-founded Interscope Records in 1990, and was chairman and CEO of Interscope Geffen A&M, an umbrella music unit formed by Universal Music Group, from 1999 to 2014.

Iovine has been involved in the production of at least 250 albums. In 2006, Iovine and Interscope signee Dr. Dre co-founded Beats Electronics. Two years later, the brand launched its first set of headphones. In late 2013, they began development for Beats Music, and released it in 2014, which went on to become the framework for Apple Music. The company was purchased by Apple Inc. for $3 billion in May 2014. At the same time, Iovine vacated his positions as chairman and CEO of Interscope Geffen A&M Records, ending his twenty-five year relationship with his label.

On August 21, 2018, after initial denial, Iovine parted ways with Apple and effectively retired from the media business. He is credited or named in institutional education centers such as the USC Jimmy Iovine and Andre Young Academy, which was inaugurated in 2013, and the Iovine and Young Center, a magnet high school which opened in Los Angeles in August 2022.

== Early life and training ==
Iovine was born on March 11, 1953, in the New York City borough of Brooklyn, to an Italian working-class family. His mother was a secretary and his father, Vincent Iovine, worked on the docks as a longshoreman. He has an older sister, born in 1946. The family lived in Brooklyn's Red Hook neighborhood. His father died in 1985.

Iovine attended a Catholic school in Brooklyn, graduating from the now-closed Bishop Ford Central Catholic High School and went on to attend New York's John Jay College of Criminal Justice. At age 19, he dropped out of college. He was introduced to music production after he met a songwriter who helped him find a job as a recording studio cleaner, and he soon began working as an engineer.

== Career ==
=== Music career ===
==== 1970s–1980s: Music production and engineering ====
In the early 1970s, Iovine became a recording engineer, working with John Lennon and Bruce Springsteen, among others. By 1973, Iovine was a part of the staff, working for the now-demolished New York City faction of the Record Plant, where he worked on Springsteen's Born to Run and Meat Loaf's Bat Out of Hell. He came to prominence through his work on Patti Smith's album Easter (1978), which included her Top 40 hit "Because the Night". He later collaborated with Tom Petty and the Heartbreakers on Damn the Torpedoes and U2 on Rattle and Hum. Iovine produced Bella Donna (the first solo album by former Fleetwood Mac member Stevie Nicks), Making Movies for Dire Straits, The Distance for Bob Seger and Get Close for The Pretenders.

Iovine was sound engineer for the Voyager Golden Records, a pair of phonograph records that were launched aboard the Voyager space probes in 1977. His father's death and love for Christmas inspired Iovine to record and oversee A Very Special Christmas in 1985. The compilation was not released until 1987 under Interscope's future sister label A&M Records. Iovine chose to not profit off the album and instead used the money from album sales to help fund Special Olympics programs. Following the release of the first album, ten more were produced. The initiative has raised over $145 million and helped more than 110 local Special Olympics programs. He was responsible for supervising the music used in the 1984 romance film Sixteen Candles, Streets of Fire and the 1988 comedy film Scrooged.

==== 1989–2014: Interscope Records ====
In 1989, Iovine and Ted Field, founder of film production label Interscope Communications, co-founded Interscope Records. A year later, the label secured a distribution deal with Atlantic Records and garnered success with artists including No Doubt, 4 Non Blondes and Gerardo. Atlantic owned a 50% stock in the label. Iovine and Field signed Tupac Shakur to a recording contract as one of the first hip-hop acts under Interscope in 1991. A year later, Interscope became notable for providing distribution, initial funding and financial oversight for the highly successful Death Row Records. Death Row, founded by Suge Knight, operated as a subsidiary of Interscope, beginning with the December 14, 1992 release of label artist and producer Dr. Dre's solo debut album The Chronic. With singles consisting of "Nuthin' but a 'G' Thang" and "Let Me Ride", both of which featuring labelmate Snoop Dogg, The Chronic sold over five million copies in the United States and became Dr. Dre's best-selling album in his career. Iovine and Dr. Dre formed a friendship following the release of The Chronic. Over 19 million records sold from Death Row, the label was largely responsible for Interscope's multi-platinum success throughout the 1990s. However, Snoop Dogg accumulated more success on Death Row and Interscope with his November 1993 debut Doggystyle. It opened at number one on the Billboard 200 with the biggest first-week sales in 1990s hip hop. In November 1995, Interscope released Tragic Kingdom by No Doubt, which sold over 16 million copies worldwide as its single, "Don't Speak" made number one on Billboard's Radio Songs chart.

In September 1995, after internal conflict with Atlantic Records over controversy concerning the label's support of gangsta rap, the label and its former parent company at the time, Time Warner made the decision to sell off its share in Interscope to Iovine and Field. In January 1996, Doug Morris, chairman and CEO of the music division of MCA Inc., convinced Iovine and Field to bring Interscope to the company in exchange for acquiring 50% of the label's shares for $200 million. As a result, Interscope was placed in the same company portfolio of labels alongside future sister label Geffen Records, MCA Records, Universal Records and DreamWorks Records. By then, MCA was sold off by Matsushita Electric (also a parent company of Panasonic) to Canadian distillery and mass media conglomerate Seagram. With Interscope now under the MCA and Seagram shade, the label managed to gain more success with Tupac Shakur's double album All Eyez on Me, which opened at number one on the Billboard 200 with 566,000 copies sold in its first week. The album became another success for the rap division of the label and Death Row Records, where artist Dr. Dre felt uncomfortable due to founder and former CEO Suge Knight's consistent spending, violent behavior and gang affiliation. As a result, Dr. Dre departed from Death Row and re-signed with Interscope through a new label deal, creating his own imprint called Aftermath Entertainment. The label's foundation proved to be challenging, when on November 26, 1996, upon release, the compilation Dr. Dre Presents: The Aftermath, was given a lukewarm response as was The Firm's The Album, despite the latter, released on October 21, 1997, almost a year after Dr. Dre Presents: The Aftermath, debuting at number one on the Billboard 200. Iovine, as stated on the 2017 HBO documentary, The Defiant Ones, was pressured by Doug Morris to either give Dr. Dre time to control his music and artists or drop him from his label. Iovine responded, "We could that, but then, you would save my salary as well because I'm going with him." Interscope had further success with Tupac Shakur's posthumous record The Don Killuminati: The 7 Day Theory as well as Snoop Dogg's Tha Doggfather and Bush's Razorblade Suitcase.

Iovine offered to sign hip hop entrepreneur Master P and his imprint, No Limit Records, but he rejected the offer. Iovine allegedly threatened him and his management team that if they would not consider the Interscope deal, they would never "find another deal in the industry nor in this town". In December 1996, MCA Music Entertainment was renamed Universal Music Group with Interscope and various other labels now being a part of the newly rebranded UMG.

Following Death Row founder Suge Knight's probation violation and prison sentence in 1997, Iovine and Interscope ended their business relationship with Death Row; the final album released under the Death Row/Interscope deal was the soundtrack to the Tupac Shakur action film, Gridlock'd, which managed to reach the Billboard 200's number one position.

In March 1998, Iovine invited Dr. Dre to his house to listen to the Slim Shady EP, released in 1997 by an underground rapper, who was participating a tournament of rap battles at the time, by the name of Eminem. The tape eventually landed in the hands of Interscope A&Rs Dean Geistlinger and D.J. Mormile, who later turned it in to label co-founder Ted Field, who also sent it to Iovine for review. Upon suggestion from Iovine, he urged Dr. Dre to find Eminem and have him join the Interscope family through Dre's label, Aftermath. Eminem has found success with both labels despite controversy involving his lyrical themes. On February 23, 1999, Eminem released his debut studio album, The Slim Shady LP, to critical acclaim. The album made its way to number two on the Billboard 200, helping to improve both Interscope and Aftermath after years of low sales.

On December 10, 1998, Seagram acquired PolyGram, and it merged with the Universal Music Group. After the PolyGram and MCA merger of Universal Music Group, Interscope became sister labels to new entries A&M Records, Def Jam Recordings, Island Records, Mercury Records and Motown. In 1998, Interscope, Geffen and A&M were put together under the umbrella label as Interscope Geffen A&M Records (IGA). Within IGA, Iovine and Field were hired to become the unit's co-chairmen and oversee operations of Interscope and Geffen.

In February 2001, Ted Field parted ways with IGA, leading Iovine to take full control of the labels. In June 2002, Iovine negotiated Eminem and Dr. Dre's joint venture agreement involving then-upcoming hip hop artist and fellow New Yorker 50 Cent. On February 9, 2003, he released his debut studio album, Get Rich or Die Tryin', to acclaim.

Between 1999 and 2003, Iovine merged A&M, DGC, MCA and DreamWorks into Interscope Geffen A&M. Because A&M co-founders Herb Alpert and Jerry Moss filed suit against Iovine, Interscope, and UMG for breach of contract involving the label's operations, A&M Records operated as a one-off subsidiary of Interscope Records. The two plaintiffs were given a $200 million out of court settlement. At the end of 2003, Iovine made over $45 million in revenue generated from music sales from his label.

For the next four years, Iovine, Interscope and Geffen saw extended success from other artists including D12, AFI, Nelly Furtado, The Roots, Gwen Stefani (as a solo artist), The Game, Robin Thicke, Bone Thugs-n-Harmony, The Pussycat Dolls and others. Iovine discovered Lady Gaga in 2007 who was sent to work with singer-songwriter Akon, who in exchange for his mentorship of Gaga, asked Iovine to sign her to Vincent Herbert's Streamline Records and Interscope.

In 2014, Universal Music Group reported that Iovine was departing from Interscope Records, ending his twenty-five year tenure with the label and vacating his fifteen-year dual position as chairman and CEO of Interscope Geffen A&M Records (now Interscope Capitol Labels Group, as of 2024). It was confirmed that the Fueled by Ramen co-founder John Janick was hired as Iovine's replacement. Janick was hired to become Interscope's president and COO in 2012. The final artist Iovine signed to his label was J. Cole. On May 28, 2014, Iovine effectively vacated his CEO and chairman positions, while departing from Interscope. The news of his departure from the label occurred following the sale of his and Dr. Dre's headphone company, Beats Electronics, to Apple Inc.

=== Business career ===
==== Beats Electronics ====
In 2006, Iovine worked with Dr. Dre to create Beats Electronics. It was originally a conversation between the two where Iovine exclaimed to Dr. Dre, "fuck sneakers, we need to do speakers." The first set of headphones were produced in 2007 and were launched in 2008. From 2009 to 2011, Beats enclosed endorsement deals with Monster Cable and Hewlett-Packard. The company had captured 20 percent market share of the headphones industry by 2012. In January 2013, Iovine announced the expansion of Beats into the online digital music world with Daisy, a new service slated to launch in late 2013. Former Topspin Media executive Ian Rogers and Nine Inch Nails frontman Trent Reznor were said to be involved. In January 2014, Beats Music was developed and opened to the public after being announced on December 8, 2013. On May 28, 2014, Apple Inc. announced the acquisition of Beats Electronics. The acquisition gave Dr. Dre and Iovine a share of over $3.24 billion, becoming the largest acquisition deal in the history of Apple's timeline. Iovine was hired to assume an undisclosed position at Apple where he helped in the creation of Apple Music, which was launched in the summer of 2015 as replacement for Beats Music. On June 27, 2018, Iovine and Dr. Dre were ordered to pay $25 million to former partner and creative designer, Steven Lamar, who sued the two co-founders for $100 million in unpaid royalties for designing the early Beats headphone models. He was the creative consultant for Apple Music until August 2018. Firstly, he denied reports of him ending his partnership with Apple in January. Citing high usage of music technology and little direction to where Apple Music could be headed to, Iovine quietly left the company and effectively retired from the media industry.

==== Other ventures ====
In August 2022, the Iovine and Young Center, a magnet high school opened in Los Angeles. The school aims to improve the declining rate of enrollment in the L.A. Unified district.

In August 2023, it was announced that the Iovine and Young Center was partnering with Atlanta Public Schools to open a new learning center at Frederick Douglass High School in August 2024. The goal of the center is to prepare students for their future academics and careers.

In August 2024, Iovine and Dr. Dre announced they would partner with Inglewood Unified School District to open a new high school to help revive a district that had been forced to close schools due to declining enrollment. Regarding the partnership, Iovine stated, “We wanted to start in the inner city, because Dre and especially me, I owe a lot to the inner city of Los Angeles and we intend to pay it back.”

=== Film and documentary productions ===
In 2002, Iovine and former Shady Records president Paul Rosenberg co-produced 8 Mile, which opened at number one in the box office and went on to gross more than $240 million worldwide. The film also garnered an Academy Award for Best Original Song for its theme song, "Lose Yourself", making Eminem the first rapper to win this award. Additionally, Iovine executive produced the 2005 crime drama Get Rich or Die Tryin', named after the 2003 debut album of its leading star, 50 Cent. He also produced the 2009 documentary More than a Game, which centered on the life and career of basketball athlete LeBron James; his label Interscope released a soundtrack for the documentary.

=== Television career ===
In 2005, Iovine made a guest appearance as himself in the Family Guy fourth season episode "Don't Make Me Over".

From 2011 to 2013, Iovine was a mentor on Fox's American Idol. Iovine's protégés—Scotty McCreery, Phillip Phillips, Jessica Sanchez, and Candice Glover—released their music through Interscope. Iovine departed from the show in mid-2013; he was replaced by Randy Jackson.

In July 2017, HBO ran a four-part documentary about Jimmy Iovine's relationship with Dr. Dre and other musicians titled The Defiant Ones.

=== Voice roles ===
Iovine and Dr. Dre had provided their voices and motion capture performances in two downloadable content updates for Grand Theft Auto Online (2013); the first was 2020's Cayo Perico Heist and the second was 2021's The Contract, the latter of which the player helps to unlock unreleased music by Dr. Dre in between missions or after completing them.

== Philanthropy ==
In May 2013, Iovine and Dr. Dre donated $70 million to the University of Southern California to create the USC Jimmy Iovine and Andre Young Academy for Arts, Technology and the Business of Innovation. The first class of the academy began in September 2014 with 31 students. On October 2, 2019, the USC opened the Iovine and Young Hall.

In April 2020, Iovine and Dr. Dre donated to the city of Compton to provide support for medical supplies, free COVID-19 testing, and 145,000 meals for residents of the city. In May 2020, Iovine and Dr. Dre partnered with restaurant chain Everytable to provide 30 days of drive-thru meals to Compton residents.

== Honors and recognitions ==
In 2011, Iovine was honored by The Producers & Engineers Wing of the Grammy Awards. "This year we pay tribute to an industry leader, Jimmy Iovine, who has made an indelible impact as a recording engineer, producer, founder of Interscope Records, and now, entrepreneur focused on audio quality," Neil Portnow, president of the National Academy of Recording Arts and Sciences, the governing body of the Grammy Awards, said in presenting the award.

On May 17, 2013, Iovine received an honorary Doctor of Music degree from the University of Southern California and gave the 2013 USC commencement address.

In 2022, Iovine was inducted into the Rock and Roll Hall of Fame in the Ahmet Ertegun Award category.

== Personal life ==
New York rock radio DJ Carol Miller and Iovine had a two-year relationship in the late 1970s. Miller says "Jimmy had a wonderful, close-knit Italian Catholic family from Brooklyn and Staten Island who could not have been nicer to me. It was I, the Jewish girl from Queens, who always felt silently out of place." She says her father was not very nice to Iovine and was against the relationship due to the differences in their religions. According to Miller, the relationship ended in 1980, when Iovine began spending most of his time in California working with singer Stevie Nicks.

While producing her album Bella Donna, Iovine entered into a relationship with Nicks. The two eventually broke up in 1982. Nicks wrote the song, "Straight Back", included in the Fleetwood Mac album, Mirage, about him. According to Nicks, Iovine was an inspiration for one of her signature songs, "Edge of Seventeen". The song also became the backbone for the guitar sample used on Destiny's Child's hit single, "Bootylicious" (2001). Nicks has said that Iovine's despondence from the death of his good friend John Lennon overwhelmed her, and eventually led to the end of their relationship. However, the strong emotion of the time led to the creation of "Edge of Seventeen".

Iovine was married to writer, lawyer, and model Vicki Iovine since 1985 before divorcing in 2006. It was finalized in 2009; the couple have four children.

In 2014, he started dating Liberty Ross, the sister of music composers Atticus and Leopold Ross. They were married in front of their Malibu beach house on Valentine's Day, February 14, 2016, with friends and family in attendance.

On November 22, 2023, Iovine was accused of sexual harassment by an unnamed woman. On February 15, 2024, the accuser dropped the sexual abuse case with prejudice. Documents obtained by Billboard also revealed that while a summons notice was filed in November 2023, no official lawsuit had been filed against Iovine after the claim was made.

== Selected discography ==
Artist	Album	Released
John Lennon	Walls and Bridges	1974
Kansas	The Classic Albums Collection: 1974–1983	1974–1983
Bruce Springsteen	Born to Run	1975
Bruce Springsteen	Darkness on the Edge of Town	1978
Golden Earring	Grab It for a Second	1978
Patti Smith	Easter	1978
Tom Petty & The Heartbreakers	Damn the Torpedoes	1979
Bruce Springsteen	The River	1980
Dire Straits	Making Movies	1980
Graham Parker and the Rumour	The Up Escalator	1980
Stevie Nicks	Bella Donna	1981
U2	Under a Blood Red Sky	1983
Simple Minds	Once Upon A Time	1985
Pretenders	Get Close	1986
Various	A Very Special Christmas	1987
U2	Rattle and Hum	1988
Gwen Stefani	Love. Angel. Music. Baby	2004
Lady Gaga	Born This Way: The Collection	2011
Iggy Azalea	The New Classic	2014

== Discography ==
Complete discography
Year	Album	Artist	Role
2014	The New Classic	Iggy Azalea	Producer
2012	5 Classic Albums	Tom Petty	Producer
2012	Horses/Easter	Patti Smith	Mixing, Producer
2012	Ladies and Gentlemen...	B. B. King	Producer
2012	Strange Euphoria	Heart	Engineer, Producer
2012	Jasmine Night Dreams	Edgar Winter Group with Rick Derringer	Mixing Assistant
2011	A Very Special Christmas, Volume 1–2	Various Artists	Executive Producer, Producer
2011	Born This Way: The Collection	Lady Gaga	Executive Producer
2011	In Touch/Midnight Rider	Tommy James	Remix Engineer
2011	Outside Society: Looking Back 1975–2007	Patti Smith	Producer
2011	The Essential Meat Loaf	Meat Loaf	Engineer, Remixer
2011	The Classic Albums Collection: 1974–1983	Kansas	Assistant Engineer
2011	Ultimate Hits: Rock and Roll Never Forgets	Bob Seger & The Silver Bullet Band	Mixing, Producer
2010	101 Punk & New Wave Anthems	Various Artists	Producer
2010	Greatest Hits	Joan Jett & The Blackhearts	Producer
2010	Double Play	Kirk Franklin	Executive Producer
2010	Nothing	N.E.R.D.	Composer, Executive Producer
2010	The Promise	Bruce Springsteen	Engineer, Mixing
2010	The Collection: 1973–1984	Bruce Springsteen	Engineer, Mixing
2010	Ultimate '80s Movie Hits	Various Artists	Producer
2009	Essential '80s: Classic Eighties	Various Artists	Producer
2009	Greatest Hits	Bruce Springsteen	Engineer, Mixing
2009	Rare Cuts	The D.I.s	Executive Producer
2009	Sex Therapy	Robin Thicke	Executive Producer
2009	The Best of 1980–2000	U2	Producer
2009	The Best of Alison Moyet	Alison Moyet	Producer
2009	Ultimate Blues: Decca	Various Artists	Executive Producer, Producer
2008	A Very Special Christmas: Playlist Plus	Various Artists	Executive Producer, Producer
2008	Bat Out of Hell/ Hits Out of Hell	Meat Loaf	Engineer, Remixing, Producer
2008	Doll Domination 2.0	The Pussycat Dolls	Executive Producer
2008	The Great Big Scottish Songbook	Various Artists	Producer
2008	Four Christmases	Various Artists	Producer
2008	Incredible	Clique Girlz	Executive Producer
2008	Lo Essential de Rock 101	Various Artists	Producer
2008	Seventies Power Ballads	Various Artists	Producer
2008	The Block	New Kids on the Block	Executive Producer
2008	Themes, Volumes 1–5	Simple Minds	Producer
2008	World's Best Dad Gift Set	Various Artists	Producer
2007	101 '80s Hits	Various Artists	Producer
2007	A Very Special Christmas: 20th Anniversary Collection	Various Artists	Executive Producer
2007	Across the Universe (Original Soundtrack)	Various Artists	Executive Producer
2007	CBGB Forever	Various Artists	Producer
2007	Crystal Visions: The Best of Stevie Nicks	Stevie Nicks	Producer
2007	Four Decades of Folk Rock	Various Artists	Producer
2007	Insomniac	Enrique Iglesias	Producer
2007	Now That's What I Call the 80's	Various Artists	Producer
2007	T-shirt/Final Exam	Loudon Wainwright III	Ensemble, Mixing
2007	World's Best Dad (2007)	Various Artists	Producer
2006	Anthology, Volumes 1–2	Gene Loves Jezebel	Producer
2006	Arista Columbia Records 1980–1991	Willie Nile	Producer
2006	I Don't Need A Man	The Pussycat Dolls	Executive Producer
2006	Pirate Radio	Pretenders	Producer
2006	The Sweet Escape	Gwen Stefani	A&R
2006	18 Singles	U2	Audio Production, Producer
2005	All Woman: Platinum Collection	Various Artists	Producer
2005	Boxed	Eurythmics	Producer
2005	Cast of Characters: The Rupert Holmes Songbook	Rupert Holmes	Assistant Engineer
2005	Don't Cha	The Pussycat Dolls	Executive Producer
2005	Great Songs of Indifference: The Anthology 1986–2001	Bob Geldof	Producer
2005	Instigator	Kaci Brown	A&R
2005	PCD	The Pussycat Dolls	Executive Producer
2005	Private Investigations: The Best of Dire Straits & Mark Knopfler	Dire Straits	Producer
2005	Stickwitu (Urban Mix)	The Pussycat Dolls	Executive Producer
2005	The Very Best of Rosanne Cash	Rosanne Cash	Producer
2005	Very Best of Natural Woman	Various Artists	Producer
2005	The Ultimate Collection	B. B. King	Producer
2004	20th Century Masters: The Best of the '80s	Various Artists	Producer
2004	Anthology: Sound + Vision	B. B. King	Producer
2004	Carved in Stone: Live at Red Rocks, Volume II	Various Artists	Producer
2004	I Don't Want to Go Home/ This Time It's for Real	Southside Johnny	Engineer, Mastering, Mixing
2004	Left of the Dial: Dispatches from the '80s Underground	Various Artists	Producer
2004	Love. Angel. Music. Baby.	Gwen Stefani	A&R
2004	Shall We Dance?	Various Artists	Executive Producer
2004	Shark Tale (Original Soundtrack)	Various Artists	Executive Producer
2003	20th Century Masters - The Millennium Collection: The Best Of	Lone Justice	Producer
2003	7	Enrique Iglesias	Executive Producer
2003	30 Best Irish Hits, Volume 2	Various Artists	Producer
2003	Damn the Torpedoes/ Southern Accents/ Hard Promises	Tom Petty	Producer
2003	Greatest Hits, Volume 2	Bob Seger & The Silver Bullet Band	Mixing, Producer
2003	Jett Rock: Greatest Hits of Joan Jett & the Blackhearts	Joan Jett & the Blackhearts	Producer
2003	Long Time Coming	Jonny Lang	A&R
2003	Rodney Rooney	Rodney Rooney	Engineer, Producer
2003	School of Rock Original Soundtrack	Various Artists	Producer
2003	Songbirds (WEA International)	Various Artists	Producer
2003	The Complete Atlantic Sessions	Mark Farner	Mixing, Producer
2003	The Essential Alison Moyet	Alison Moyet	Producer
2003	The Essential Bruce Springsteen	Bruce Springsteen	Engineer, Mixing
2003	Who Will I Run To/ Kiss Me Like That	Kiley Dean	Executive Producer
2002	Grammy Nominees 2002	Various Artists	Executive Producer
2002	Greatest Hits (Universal Japan)	B. B. King	Producer
2002	Greetings from Asbury Park/ The Wild, The Innocent/ Darkness on the Edge of Town	Bruce Springsteen	Engineer, Mixing
2002	Land (1975–2002)	Patti Smith	Producer
2002	Live and Unreleased from Farmclub.com	Various Artists	Executive Producer
2002	Meat Loaf and Friends (2002 Version)	Meat Loaf	Producer
2002	The Best of Simple Minds	Simple Minds	Producer
2002	The Story So Far: The Very Best of Rod Stewart	Rod Stewart	Producer
2002	America: A Tribute to Heroes	Various Artists	Producer
2001	Bridget Jones's Diary (Original Soundtrack)	Various Artists	Producer
2001	Bridget Jones's Diary, Volume 2 (Original Soundtrack)	Various Artists	Producer
2001	Collection	Tracy Chapman	Producer
2001	The Very Best of Rod Stewart (Warner Bros.)	Rod Stewart	Producer
2001	Ultimate Collection	Graham Parker	Producer
2001	Anthology	B.B. King	Producer
2001	Anthology: Through the Years	Tom Petty	Producer
2001	Greatest Hits Pretenders	Pretenders	Producer
2000	Lucky Numbers	Soundtrack: Various Artists	Producer
2000	Ultimate Collection	Maria McKee	Producer
1999	18 Tracks	Bruce Springsteen	Engineer
1999	200 Cigarettes Original Soundtrack	Various Artists	Producer
1999	Damn the Torpedoes/ Southern Accents/ Into the Great Wide Open	Tom Petty	Producer
1999	Dead Ringer/ Midnight at the Lost and Found/ Bat Out of Hell	Meat Loaf	Producer
1999	Girls Night Out (Telstar TV)	Girls Night Out	Producer
1999	His Definitive Greatest Hits	B. B. King	Producer
1999	Master Hits: Graham Parker	Graham Parker	Producer
1999	This World Is Not My Home	Lone Justice	Producer
1999	Voodoo Dollies: The Best of Gene Loves Jezebel	Gene Loves Jezebel	Producer
1998	Armageddon: The Album	Various Artists	Producer
1998	Atlantic Records 50 Years: The Gold Anniversary	Various Artists	Producer
1998	Enchanted: The Words of Stevie Nicks	Stevie Nicks	Producer
1998	First Generation: Virgin 25 Years	Various Artists	Producer
1998	My Hometown	Bruce Springsteen	Engineer, Producer
1998	Sultans of Swing: The Very Best of Dire Straits	Dire Straits	Producer
1998	The Nu Nation Project	Kirk Franklin	Executive Producer
1998	The Very Best of Meat Loaf	Meat Loaf	Engineer, Remixing
1998	Tracks	Bruce Springsteen	Engineer, Mixing
1997	'80s Hits Back, Volume 3	Various Artists	Producer
1997	Diana, Princess of Wales: Tribute	Various Artists	Producer
1997	Fit to Be Tied: Greatest Hits by Joan Jett & the Blackhearts	Joan Jett & the Blackhearts	Producer
1997	Home Alone Christmas	Various Artists	Producer
1997	One Step Up/ Two Steps Back: The Songs of Bruce Springsteen	Bruce Springsteen	Engineer
1997	Sounds of the Season	Various Artists	Engineer, Producer
1997	The Very Best of Mother's Finest: Not Yer Mother's Funk	Mother's Finest	Producer
1996	Greatest Rock Hits of the '80s	Various Artists	Producer
1996	It Takes Two (Columbia)	Various Artists	Producer
1996	Mellow Classics	Various Artists	Producer
1996	No Holding Back	Graham Parker	Producer
1996	The Patti Smith Masters: The Collective Works	Patti Smith	Mixing, Producer
1996	This Is the '80s	Various Artists	Producer
1996	XXI	Dwight Twilley	Mixing
1995	Airport: The Motors' Greatest Hits	The Motors	Producer
1995	Best Rock Ballads in the World...Ever	Various Artists	Producer
1995	Christmas of Hope	Various Artists	Engineer, Producer
1995	Geffen Vintage '80s, Volume 1	Various Artists	Producer
1995	Greatest Hits	Bruce Springsteen	Audio Production, Engineer, Mixing
1995	Exhale (Shoop Shoop)	Whitney Houston	Producer
1995	Playback	Tom Petty	Producer
1995	The Best Rock Album in the World...Ever!	Various Artists	Producer
1995	Singles (US/UK)	Alison Moyet	Producer
1994	Angel of Harlem	U2	Producer
1994	Flashback	Joan Jett & The Blackhearts	Producer
1994	Greatest Hits	Bob Seger & the Silver Bullet Band	Producer
1994	Keep the Fire Burnin'	Dan Hartman	Producer
1994	Reality Bites (Original Soundtrack)	Various Artists	Producer
1994	Sedated in the Eighties	Various Artists	Producer
1994	The Air Up There (Music From and Inspired By The Motion Picture)	Various Artists	Executive Producer
1994	The Lead and How to Swing It	Tom Jones	Executive Producer
1993	Dead Ringer/Bat Out of Hell	Meat Loaf	Audio Production
1993	Greatest Hits: Tom Petty	Tom Petty	Producer
1993	Passion Is No Ordinary Word: The Graham Parker Anthology 1976–1991	Graham Parker	Producer
1993	Now: 1986 (1993)	Various Artists	Producer
1993	Robin Zander	Robin Zander	Producer
1992	Classic Rock Box: WNEW-FM 25th Anniversary Box	Various Artists	Producer
1992	A Very Special Christmas, Volume 2	Various Artists	Executive Producer, Producer
1992	Glittering Prize 1981–1992	Simple Minds	Producer
1992	I Will Always Love You	Whitney Houston	Producer
1992	King of the Blues(Box)	B. B. King	Producer
1992	Matters of the Heart	Tracy Chapman	Producer
1992	Rock the First, Volume 5	Various Artists	Producer
1991	Classic Rock: 1966–1988	Various Artists	Producer
1991	Greatest Hits	Eurythmics	Producer
1991	Timespace: The Best of Stevie Nicks	Stevie Nicks	Producer
1990	Dream A Little Dream	Various Artists	Producer
1989	A Very Special Christmas	Various Artists	Executive Producer, Producer
1989	Angel	Eurythmics	Producer
1989	Don't Ask Me Why	Eurythmics	Producer
1989	Roadhouse (Original Soundtrack)	Various Artists	Executive Producer, Producer
1989	Soundtrack Smashes: The '80s	Various Artists	Producer
1989	Storyteller: The Complete Anthology 1964–1990	Rod Stewart	Producer
1989	Suspicion	Gene Loves Jezebel	Producer
1989	The Continuing Story of Radar Love	Golden Earring	Producer
1989	The King and Queen of America	The Eurythmics	Producer
1989	These Here Are Crazy Times	Boom Crash Opera	Producer
1989	We Too Are One	Eurythmics	Audio Production, Producer
1988	Desire	U2	Producer
1988	Dream of Life	Patti Smith	Producer
1988	Easy Pieces	Easy Pieces	Example
1988	Folkways: A Vision Shared: A Tribute To Woody Guthrie and Leadbelly	Various Artists	Producer
1988	Money for Nothing	Dire Straits	Producer
1988	Rattle and Hum	U2	Producer
1988	Scrooged (Original Soundtrack)	Various Artists	Music Supervisor
1988	See the Light	The Jeff Healey Band	Producer
1987	Bedrock Vice	Thrashing Doves	Producer
1987	The Breakfast Club	Breakfast Club	Producer
1987	Light Of Day (Original Soundtrack)	Various Artists	Producer
1987	Maria Vidal	Maria Vidal	Executive Producer, Producer
1987	Raindancing	Alison Moyet	Producer
1987	The Motion of Love	Gene Loves Jezebel	Producer
1987	The Singles	Pretenders	Producer
1987	Tunnel of Love	Bruce Springsteen	Engineer, Producer
1986	Get Close	Pretenders	Producer
1986	Live 1975–1985	Bruce Springsteen	Engineer
1986	Menlove Ave.	John Lennon	Assistant Engineer
1986	Rock For Amnesty	Various Artists	Producer
1986	Shelter	Lone Justice	Producer
1986	The Lover Speaks	The Lover Speaks	Producer
1985	Confrontation	Face to Face	Producer
1985	Lone Justice	Lone Justice	Producer
1985	Make It Better (Forget About Me)	Tom Petty	Producer
1985	Once Upon a Time	Simple Minds	Producer
1985	Rock a Little	Stevie Nicks	Producer
1985	Rocky IV (Original Soundtrack)	Various Artists	Producer
1985	Southern Accents	Tom Petty	Producer
1985	Weird Science (Original Soundtrack)	Various Artists	Producer
1984	Against All Odds (Original Soundtrack)	Various Artists	Producer
1984	Cat Dancer	Sandy Stewart	Executive Producer, Producer
1984	Face to Face	Face to Face	Producer
1984	Glorious Results of a Misspent Youth	Joan Jett & The Blackhearts	Producer
1984	I Can Dream About You	Dan Hartman	Producer
1984	Sixteen Candles (Original Soundtrack)	Various Artists	Producer
1984	Streets of Fire (Original Soundtrack)	Various Artists	Producer
1983	Body Wishes	Rod Stewart	Producer
1983	Change of Heart	Tom Petty	Producer
1983	Stand Back	Stevie Nicks	Producer
1983	Reelin' in the Years, Volume 1	Various Artists	Mixing, Producer
1983	The Crossing	Big Country	Mixing
1983	The Wild Heart	Stevie Nicks	Producer
1983	Under A Blood Red Sky	U2	Producer
1982	Long After Dark	Tom Petty	Producer
1982	Officer and a Gentleman(Original Soundtrack)	Various Artists	Producer
1982	The Distance	Bob Seger & the Silver Bullet Band	Producer
1981	A Woman in Love (It's Not Me)	Tom Petty	Producer
1981	Bad For Good	Jim Steinman	Producer
1981	Bella Donna	Stevie Nicks	Producer
1981	Dead Ringer	Meat Loaf	Producer
1981	Golden Down	Willie Nile	Producer
1981	Hard Promises	Tom Petty	Producer
1980	Making Movies	Dire Straits	Producer
1980	Rockin' at Ground Zero	The Gears	Executive Producer
1980	Tenement Steps	The Motors	Producer
1980	The River	Bruce Springsteen	Engineer
1980	The Up Escalator	Graham Parker	Audio Production, Producer
1980	This Day and Age	D.L. Byron	Producer
1979	Damn The Torpedoes	Tom Petty	Producer
1979	Don't Do Me Like That	Tom Petty	Producer
1979	Live	Mother's Finest	Producer
1979	No Frills	Mark Farner	Audio Production, Producer
1979	Perfect Stranger	Robert Fleischman	Producer
1979	Refugee	Tom Petty	Producer
1978	Darkness on the Edge of Town	Bruce Springsteen	Engineer, Mixing
1978	Easter	Patti Smith Group	Producer, Mixing
1978	Grab It For A Second	Golden Earring	Producer
1978	Paley Brothers	Paley Brothers	Producer
1978	The Flame	The Flame	Producer
1977	Bat Out of Hell	Meat Loaf	Engineer
1976	I Don't Want to Go Home	Southside Johnny & the Asbury Jukes	Engineer
1975	Bobby Short Celebrates Rodgers & Hart	Bobby Short	Engineer
1975	Born to Run	Bruce Springsteen	Audio Engineer, Engineer, Mixing
1975	Jasmine Nightdreams	Edgar Winter Group	Mixing Assistant
1975	Jasmine Nightdreams	Edgar Winter Group with Rick Derringer	Mixing Assistant
1974	Hard Labor	Three Dog Night	Mixing Assistant
1974	Kansas	Kansas	Assistant Engineer
1974	Pussy Cats	Harry Nilsson	Assistant Engineer
1974	Shock Treatment	The Edgar Winter Group	Assistant Engineer
1974	Saints & Sinners	Johnny Winter	Engineer
1974	Walls and Bridges	John Lennon	Overdub Engineer
1973	Western Head Music Co.	Augie Meyers	Bass

== Filmography ==
Complete filmography
Date	Title	Credit	Format
2024	Piece by Piece	Himself	Film
2020	Grand Theft Auto Online	Himself	Video Game
2017	The Defiant Ones	Himself	TV documentary
2013	Nina	Executive Producer	Film
2011	Lady Gaga Presents: The Monster Ball Tour at Madison Square Garden	Executive Producer	TV documentary
2011	American Idol	Mentor (Season 10 – Season 12)	TV series
2009	Archie's Final Project	Executive Producer	Film
2008	More Than a Game	Executive Producer	Film
2008	Ringo Starr: Off the Record	Executive Producer	TV documentary
2006	Off the Record: Bono and The Edge	Executive Producer	TV documentary
2008	Pussycat Dolls Present: Girlicious	Executive Producer	TV series (6 Episodes)
2007	Cane	Executive Producer	TV series (12 Episodes)
2006	Rock Legends: Platinum Weird	Executive Producer	TV movie
2005	Get Rich or Die Tryin'	Executive Producer	Film
2003	Interscope Records Presents The Next Episode	Executive Producer	TV series
2003	Super Bowl XXXVII Halftime Show	Executive Producer	TV special
2002	8 Mile	Executive Producer	Film
2001	Farmclub.com	Executive Producer	TV series
1989	Road House	Music Supervisor	Film
