= SHORTZ! =

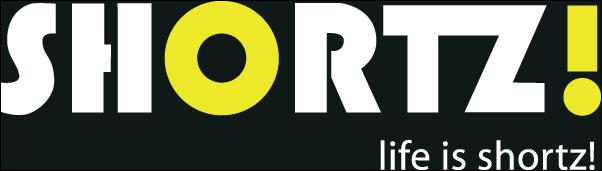

SHORTZ! for mobile content, is a mobile portal created for the exhibition of short films and animation series. The portal, although accessible on PC with certain Internet web browsers (such as Mozilla Firefox), was conceived for viewing on mobile devices and thus only allows the download of short films on portable media players.

SHORTZ! offers currently a programming of over 700 short films (including many animation productions) and more than 20 mini-series from more than 30 European countries and 15 from non-European countries. The vast majority of the short movies are European.

The mobile portal navigation menu is available in 11 European languages. On the home page there are a number of short films that can be downloaded for free, although most of the catalogue can only be accessed through entering a code.

Both the website and the mobile site include information on short film festivals that take place across Europe. On the website there is also a section called "Behind the scenes" that provides an insight into the short film industry.

The mobile portal SHORTZ! has received the support of the European Commission MEDIA Program for the development of the audiovisual sector in the continent. Specifically Video on Demand (VOD) projects.

== Sources ==
- European Commission MEDIA Program: General Information
- European Commission MEDIA Program: Supported Projects
