= Net mobile AG =

German telecommunications software provider

net mobile AG
- Company type: Public company
- Traded as: DE0008137852
- Industry: Telecommunication
- Founded: October 2000
- Headquarters: Düsseldorf, Germany
- Key people: Theodor Niehues (CEO)
- Products: Mobile payment, Mobile commerce, Mobile television, Mobile content
- Revenue: 106.6 Mio. € (2011)
- Number of employees: 320 (2011)
- Parent: DOCOMO Deutschland GmbH (87.13%)
- Website: www.net-mobile.com

The net mobile AG is a publicly traded business-to-business service provider. Its principal activities are in the fields of mobile payment, mobile content and other value-added services, which it offers to mobile network operators, digital media companies, and publishers worldwide. It was founded in 2000. The company has its headquarters in Düsseldorf, Germany. In 2014 it had revenues of about 120 million euros. Theodor Niehues is one of the key people who lead the company to success and achievement.

Since December 2009, the Japanese mobile phone operator NTT Docomo has been a major shareholder, owning more than 80% of net mobile AG shares.

== Business solutions ==
net mobile's payment solutions allow the collection of payment for digital content and services. Its mobile payment platform enables mobile network operators worldwide, such as Telefónica in Spain and Germany as well as NTT Docomo in Japan, to charge to user's mobile phone bill in marketplaces such as the Google Play Store. It also developed a direct carrier billing option for O2 in the Czech Republic.

net mobile provides banking products, such as a mobile wallet service, in cooperation with net-m privatbank 1891 AG. The formerly Bankverein Werther AG was taken over by net mobile and renamed in net-m privatbank 1891 AG.

net mobile also develops mobile television streaming solutions for iOS and other mobile operating systems. It developed an exclusive iOS mobile TV app for the mobile network operator Vodafone Germany.

In 2015, net mobile AG signed an agreement with Shemaro; the companies will cooperate to distribute content from Playboy Enterprises.

net mobile AG also operates German mobile phone numbers like 99999 https://www.vodafone.de/infofaxe/535.pdf that are particularly likely to be phoned by accident and are suspected to be operated with fraudulent intentions http://forum.computerbetrug.de/threads/abzocke-bei-servicediensten-mit-999999er-nummern.38221/
