= Christa Mühl =

German television director

Christa Mühl (11 June 1947 – 14 October 2019) was a German director, screenwriter and writer.

== Life ==
Mühl was born and grew up in Halle (Saale) as the daughter of an electrician, completed an apprenticeship as a skilled worker, worked at a workers' theater and, after graduating from high school, began studying directing at the Hochschule für Film und Fernsehen der DDR in Babelsberg. From 1973 she worked as an assistant director in the dramatic arts department of GDR German Television. Among others, she worked here with Thomas Langhoff.

From 1977 until Wende she was a director in the field of television drama. She adapted novels by Bertolt Brecht, Anna Seghers and Theodor Fontane and made crime dramas (e.g. for Polizeiruf 110). Mühl also worked as a mentor in acting and directing at the Konrad Wolf Academy of Film and Television. In 1988, she received the Art Prize of the GDR.

After 1990 she remained true to her craft and directed more than 40 episodes of the hospital series Für alle Fälle Stefanie for television. At the same time, she worked as a screenwriter. From 2004 she worked extensively with the telenovela. In a regional magazine, Mühl was called the "mother of the telenovela". She was on the team of the successful ARD series Rote Rosen director from the very beginning. In 2015, she made her debut as a crime writer with "Seniorenknast – Wir kommen" (Senior Prison – We're Coming).

Christa Mühl was married to the author, Brecht researcher and publisher Werner Hecht. Her final resting place was in the cemetery of the Dorotheenstädtische and Friedrichswerdersche Gemeinden in Berlin-Mitte.

Mühl died in Berlin on 14 October 2019 at the age of 72.

== Filmography ==
- 1971: Die Kollwitz und ihre Kinder (university film)
- 1977: Death and Resurrection of Wilhelm Hausmann (TV, also book)
- 1979: The Revenge of Captain Mitchell based on the story Safety first by Bertolt Brecht (TV)
- 1980: Puppen für die Nacht (TV)
- 1982: Generalprobe (TV)
- 1983: Paulines zweites Leben (also book)
- 1985: Franziska (TV)
- 1986: Weihnachtsgeschichten (TV)
- 1986: Das wirkliche Blau based on the story of the same name by Anna Seghers (TV)
- 1987: Polizeiruf 110: Abschiedslied für Linda (TV)
- 1987: Hasenherz
- 1989: Der lange Weg zu Angerer (TV)
- 1992–1994: Marienhof (TV series, also book)
- 1995–1998: Stubbe - Von Fall zu Fall, writer and director (TV series, also book)
- 1995–2001: Für alle Fälle Stefanie (TV series, also book)
- 1998: Das Traumschiff – Argentinien (TV, book only)
- 1999: Das Traumschiff – Tahiti (TV, book only)
- 2000: Lebenslügen (TV, book only)
- 2001: Die Biester (TV series)
- 2001–2003: Schlosshotel Orth (TV series, also book)
- 2004–2005: Bianca - Wege zum Glück (TV series)
- 2005–2007: Wege zum Glück (TV series)
- 2006–2010: Rote Rosen (TV series)
