= WEG =

Weg means way in several Germanic languages.

Weg or WEG may refer to:

== People ==
- Ruth B. Weg (1920–2002), American gerontologist
- William Ellis Green (1923–2008), Australian cartoonist
- William Ewart Gladstone (1809–1898), British prime minister

== Places ==
- Weg naar Zee, a resort area in Suriname, South America

== Media ==
- Weg!, travel magazine
- Der Weg, political magazine in Argentine
- Neuer Weg, Romanian daily newspaper
- Neuer Weg, East German political magazine
- West End Girls, song by Pet Shop Boys
- World's End Girlfriend, stage name for Japanese musician Katsuhiko Maeda.

== Organizations ==
- WEG Industries, one of the largest electric motor manufacturers in the world
- West End Games, publisher of roleplaying games
- West End Gang, an organized crime group in Canada
- Württembergische Eisenbahn-Gesellschaft, a railway company in Germany

== Sports ==
- FEI World Equestrian Games
- Woodbine Entertainment Group, horse racing operator located in Canada
- World e-Sports Games, a major league of e-sports

== Other ==
- Water Equivalent to a Global layer, a measure of a theoretical water height on a terrestrial planet, if all water ice would become liquid
- World Education Games, a global online competition focused on mathematics, science and literacy
- Wright Eclipse Gemini, a double decker bus body built by Wrightbus since 2001

== See also ==
- Wege (disambiguation)
