= USC Jimmy Iovine and Andre Young Academy =

School at the University of Southern California

Coordinates: 34°1′7″N 118°17′18″W

- Other names: USC Iovine and Young, The Academy, IYA
- Motto in English: The Degree is in Disruption
- Established: 2013
- Parent institution: University of Southern California
- Endowment: $70 million
- Dean: Thanassis Rikakis
- Undergraduates: 114
- Location: Los Angeles, California, United States
- Website: iovine-young.usc.edu

The USC Jimmy Iovine and Andre Young Academy (also known as USC Iovine and Young Academy, the Academy, or IYA) is located at the University of Southern California in the United States. The Academy is the university’s 20th professional school.

The Iovine and Young Academy is highly competitive and admits a small cohort of students each year. As of 2024, Academy startups have raised more than $200 million in funding and acquisition payouts.

== History ==
The Academy was founded in 2013 following a $70 million donation by Jimmy Iovine and Andre (Dr. Dre) Young. The Academy offers a Bachelor of Science degree in Arts, Technology, and the Business of Innovation.

Erica Muhl served as the Academy's founding dean from 2013 to 2021. On July 8, 2021, it was announced that Thanassis Rikakis, a professor of bioengineering at Virginia Tech, would be joining the Academy as its second dean. His tenure began August 23, 2021.

In 2017, the Academy launched a new online professional master's degree program in Integrated Design, Business and Technology.

On September 4, 2024, the Academy and the USC Marshall School of Business announced they will offer a joint Bachelor of Science degree in the Business of Innovation.

== Iovine and Young Hall ==
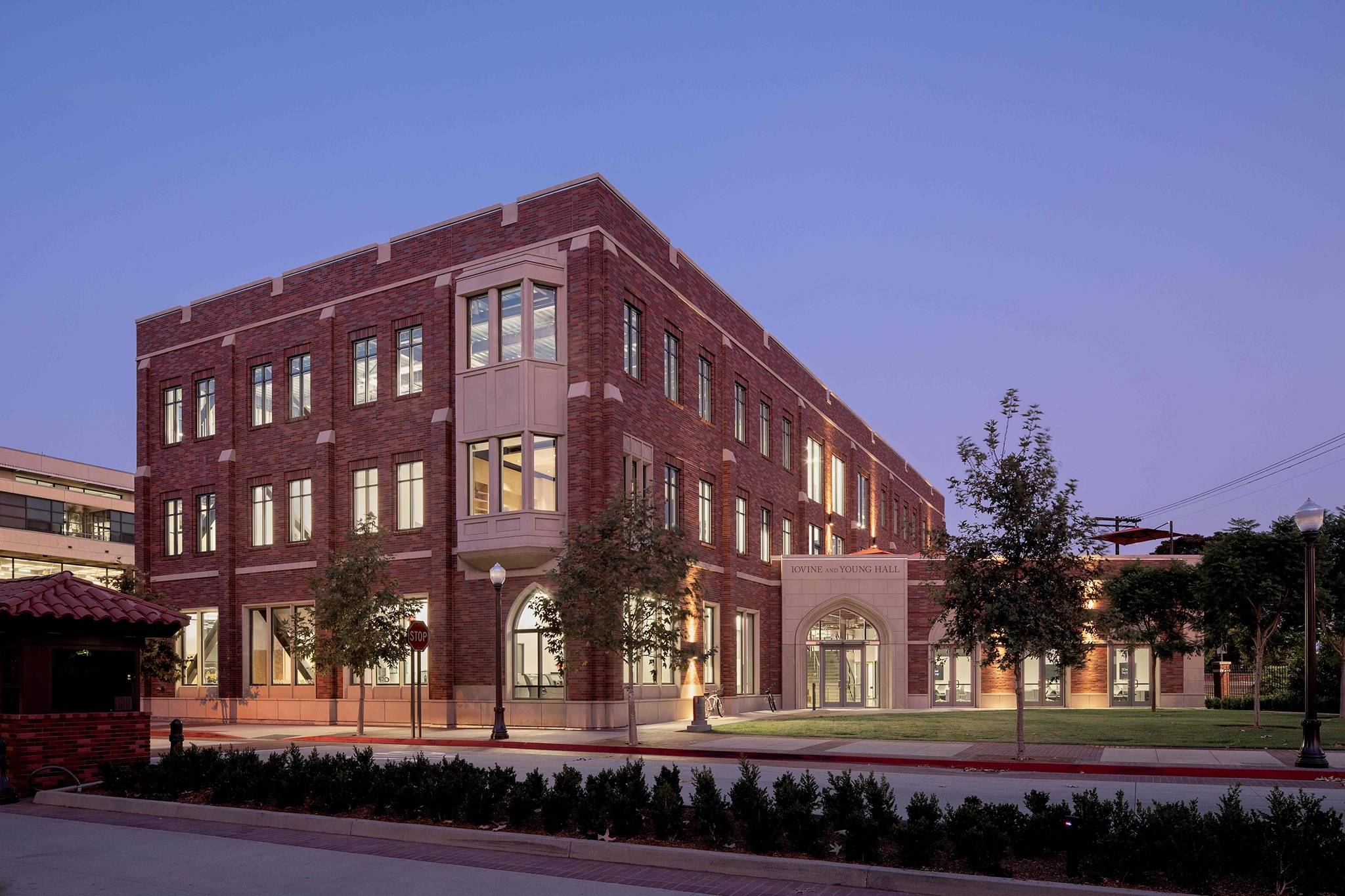
Iovine and Young Hall

The Iovine and Young Hall opened on October 2, 2019. It is a three-story, 40,000-square-foot building. The school houses a fabrication lab for metal, wood, plastics, and electronics; a multimedia lab for motion capture, photo, video, and audio; an adaptive studio/lecture classrooms; an alumni incubator for Academy student-founded companies; and a podcast booth.
