= Face to Face (1984 Face to Face album) =

Studio album by Face to Face
- Released: 1984
- Genre: Pop
- Length: 53:26
- Label: Epic
- Producer: Arthur Baker, Michael Baker, Jimmy Iovine, Gordon Perry

Face to Face chronology
Face to Face (1984)	Confrontation (1985)

Professional ratings
Review scores
Source	Rating
AllMusic	4/5 stars

Face to Face is the self-titled debut album of the Boston band Face to Face, originally released in 1984 on LP (BFE 38857) and Cassette by Epic Records. It peaked at #126 on the Billboard chart in the summer of 1984.

== Reissue ==
Epic Records issued the album on CD in Japan exclusively, although the single "10-9-8" may be found on various 1980s compilation CDs released in North America. In 2006, the independent label Wounded Bird Records issued the album on CD for the first time in the United States.

== Music videos ==
"10-9-8" and "Under the Gun" were released as singles, and videos were produced for each.

== Track listing ==
All songs written by Angelo Petraglia, except where indicated.

=== Side 1 ===
No.	Title	Writer(s)	Length
1.	"Out of My Hands"	Angelo Petraglia, Michael Baker	4:48
2.	"All Because of You"		3:45
3.	"Face in Front of Mine"		4:35
4.	"Pictures of You"		3:58
5.	"Over the Edge"		3:06

=== Side 2 ===
No.	Title	Writer(s)	Length
6.	"Under the Gun"	Face to Face, Arthur Baker	4:35
7.	"10-9-8"		3:54
8.	"Don't Talk Like That"	Angelo Petraglia, Michael Baker, Stuart Kimball	3:57
9.	"Heaven on Earth"		3:23
10.	"Wreckless Heart"		3:54

CD Re-issue bonus tracks
No.	Title	Length
11.	"10-9-8" (12" Dance Mix)	5:42
12.	"Under the Gun" (12" Dance Mix)	7:01

Track 11:

- Originally released in 1984 as Epic 12" single 49–4989
- Produced and mixed by Arthur Baker

Track 12:

- Originally released in 1984 as Epic 12" single 49–5033
- Produced by Arthur Baker
- Mixed by Arthur Baker & Chris Lord-Alge
- Edited by Tony Moran and Albert Calbrera
