= One Big Day =

Studio album by Face to Face
- Released: 1988
- Genre: Country rock
- Length: 43:33
- Label: Mercury
- Producer: Anton Fier

Face to Face chronology
Confrontation (1985)	One Big Day (1988)

One Big Day is the third album by the American band Face to Face, released in 1988. It was produced by Anton Fier. It was the band's final album; they disbanded shortly after its release.

== Critical reception ==
Professional ratings
Review scores
Source	Rating
AllMusic	3/5 stars
Orlando Sentinel	4/5 stars

The Orlando Sentinel deemed the album "flat out good," noting that the band had shifted from "electrobeat pop to country-flavored rock." The Washington Post wrote that "the songs are smart, the arrangements are countrypolitan with a metallic glint, and [Laurie] Sargent meets them with a warm clarion call that's often multi-tracked." Trouser Press opined that in a "misuse of talent, Syd Straw and Bernie Worrell contribute to the tunefully bland proceedings."

== Track listing ==
All songs written by Laurie Sargent and Angelo Petraglia except as indicated.

1. "As Forever as You"
2. "Change in the Wind" (Petraglia)
3. "A Place Called Home"
4. "Never Had a Reason" (Sargent, Petraglia, Stuart Kimball)
5. "The Day I Was Born" (Petraglia)
6. "She's a Contradiction"
7. "I Believe in You"
8. "Ever Since Eve (Blood Gone Bad)"
9. "Some Stories" (Petraglia)
10. "Grass Is Greener"
