= Tanja Wedhorn =

German actress (born 1971)

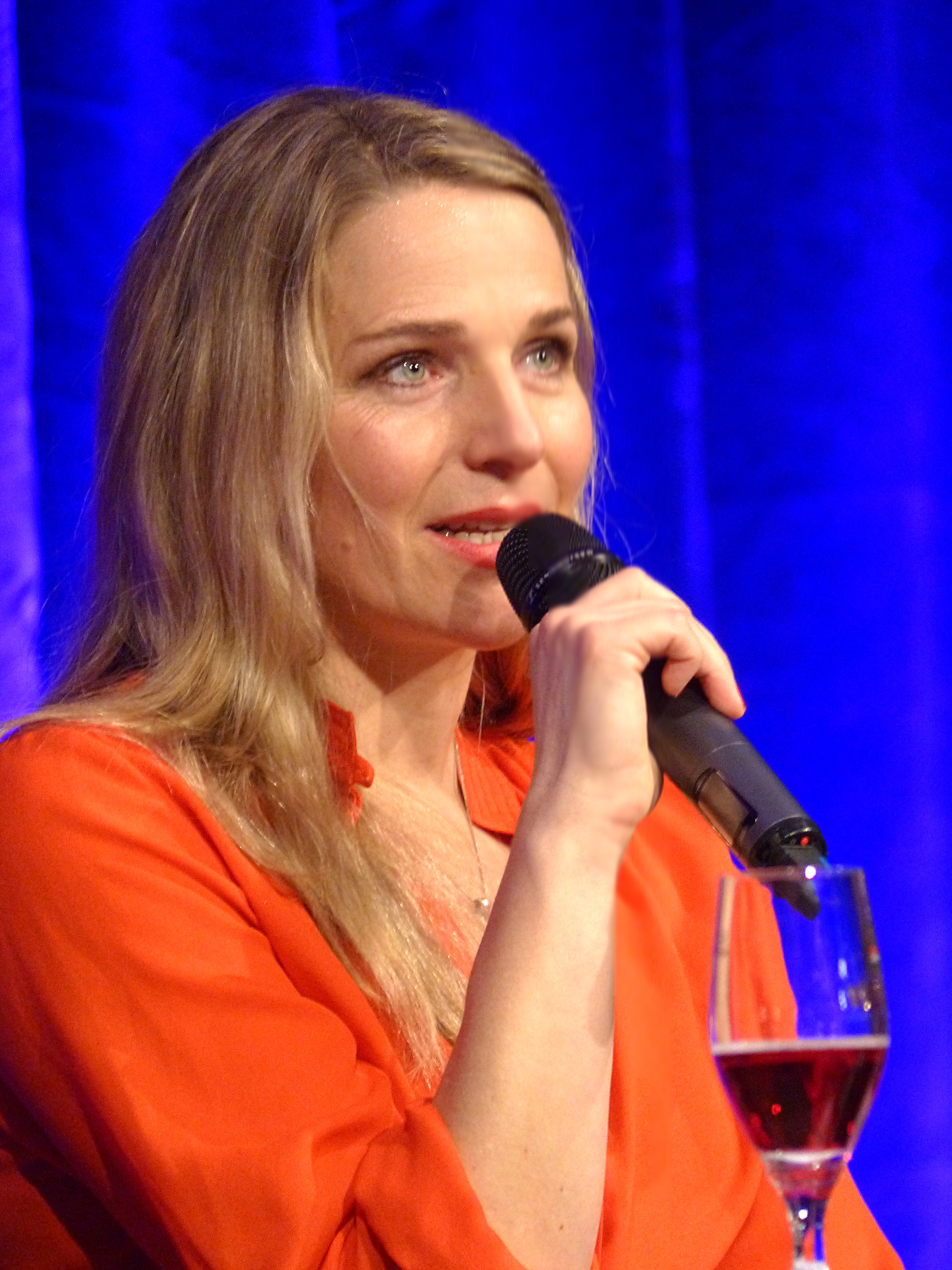
Tanja Wedhorn in "Eine Sommernacht", Tourpremiere 9.02.'15, Iserlohn

Tanja Wedhorn (born 14 December 1971 in Witten) is a German actress. She studied acting at the Berlin University of the Arts and lives in Berlin. She has two sons.

Tanja Wedhorn became famous for her performance in the leading role of Germany's first telenovela Bianca – Wege zum Glück. The show was broadcast in Germany in 2004 and 2005 by the public broadcasting station ZDF.

She received a Golden Romy in Austria in the category of Most Popular Actress in 2005.
