= Susanne Berckhemer =

German actress

Susanne Berckhemer (born 20 March 1978, in Augsburg) is a German actress. She graduated in 1997, having studied at the Bavarian August Everding Theatre Academy in Munich, where she gained a degree in comedy.

Susanne Berckhemer played many roles in the series Tatort and in Verliebt in Berlin in the role of Britta Haas. She also played the role of the antagonist Nadine Dannenberg, in the series Tessa – Leben für die Liebe. In August 2007, she acted in the series Rosamunde Pilcher - Sieg der Liebe, in the main role of Emma Clark. She acted in the successful series Wege zum Glück, until July 2008 (episode 703, shown on 20 October 2008 on ZDF), in the main role of Luisa Becker (born Maywald).

As well as a career as an actress, Susanne tried to explore her origins in a project with her friend, the dramaturgist Dagmar Domrös. In Sibiu, the European Cultural capital of 2007, the play Ein Dorf erzählt... Zalina was performed in the village of Hosman (Romania), along with Spree Agent and other collaborative artists. Susanne stated that the objective was to benefit the young inhabitants of the Romanian village to experience cultural pursuits such as theatre. An association named after her was created in the area.

Susanne Berckhemer became a mother in January 2009. She lives with her child and companion Thorsten Werner, in Berlin.

== Filmography ==
Cinema and television

- 2001: Dead Island: School's Out 2
- 2004: Tatort (episode Eine Leiche zuviel)
- 2006: Tatort (episode Gebrochene Herzen)
- 2005-2006: Verliebt in Berlin, series
- 2006: Tessa – Leben für die Liebe, series
- 2007: Rosamunde Pilcher (episode Sieg der Liebe)
- 2007-2008: Wege zum Glück, series
- 2009: Wege zum Glück, series (guest)
- 2009: Leipzig Homicide, series

Short films

- 1998: L'Image fantôme
- 1998: Insomnia
- 1999: Kümmel und Korn

=== Adverts ===
- 2007: Uncle Ben's Express Reis (video)
