= Christoph Fisser =

German film producer

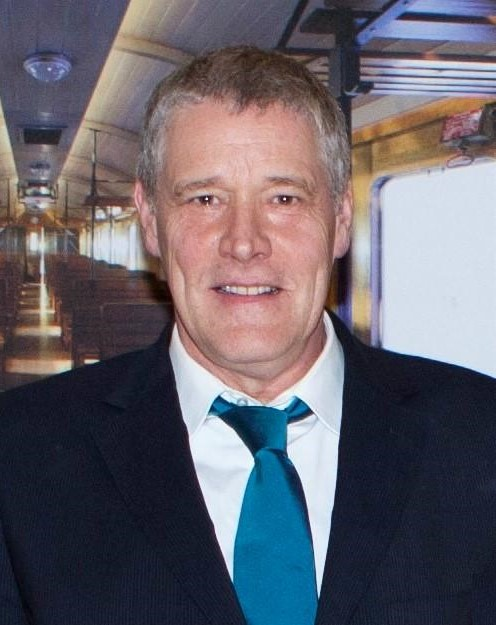
Christoph Fisser in 2015

Christoph Fisser, born in 1960, is a German film producer. He is Vice-President/COO of Studio Babelsberg AG and Managing Director of the film production company Babelsberg Film. Christoph Fisser acquired Studio Babelsberg together with his business associate and present CEO Charlie Woebcken in July 2004 from the French media group Vivendi.

Christoph Fisser (co-)produced many German and international films and series.

== Selected credits ==
Co-producer:

- The Counterfeiters (2007)
- Speed Racer (2007)
- Valkyrie (2007)
- The International (2007)
- The Reader (2008)
- Inglourious Basterds (2008)
- The Ghost Writer (2009)
- Anonymous (2011)
- The Book Thief (2013)
- The Monuments Men (2014)
- The Hunger Games: Mockingjay – Part 1 (2014)
- Bridge of Spies (2015)
- The Hunger Games: Mockingjay – Part 2 (2015)
- Point Break (2015)
- Captain America: Civil War (2016)
- Renegades (2016)
- A Cure for Wellness (2017)
- The Girl in the Spider's Web (2018)
- Charlie's Angels (2019)
- The Matrix 4 (2021)
- Uncharted (2022)

Executive Producer:

- The Voices (2015)
- The Grand Budapest Hotel (2014)
- Isle of Dogs (2018)
- A Hidden Life (2019)
- The French Dispatch
