= Confrontation (Face to Face album) =

Studio album by Face to Face
- Released: 1985
- Genre: Rock
- Label: Epic
- Producer: Ed Stasium, Zach Smith, Arthur Baker

Face to Face chronology
Face to Face (1984)	Confrontation (1985)	One Big Day (1988)

Confrontation is the second album by the Boston band Face to Face. It was produced in part by Arthur Baker.

Like the 1984 debut, most of the songs were written by Angelo, with Laurie Sargent credited as co-writer on half. The record was not a commercial success and would be their last release on Epic Records. Many vinyl pressings in circulation can be found with a gold promo stamp on the back cover, making the non-promo copy more desirable to collectors due to its rarity.

"Tell Me Why" was released as a single in the United States.

== Critical reception ==
Professional ratings
Review scores
Source	Rating
AllMusic	2/5 stars

Trouser Press concluded that "the routine presentation and sound make this Confrontation too radio-ready to be interesting."

== Reissue ==
Epic Records made this available on compact disc in Japan. In 2006, Wounded Bird Records issued the album on CD in the United States.

== Track listing ==
1. "Tell Me Why" (4:40)
2. "Confess" (3:28)
3. "Why Do I Say" (4:18)
4. "Too Late" (3:23)
5. "The 4th Watch" (5:05)
6. "Walk into the Fire" (4:09)
7. "When Time Stands Still" (3:44)
8. "Shake the World" (4:27)
9. "A Boy Like You" (3:42)
10. "America's Dream" (4:18)
