= Carl Woebcken =

German film producer

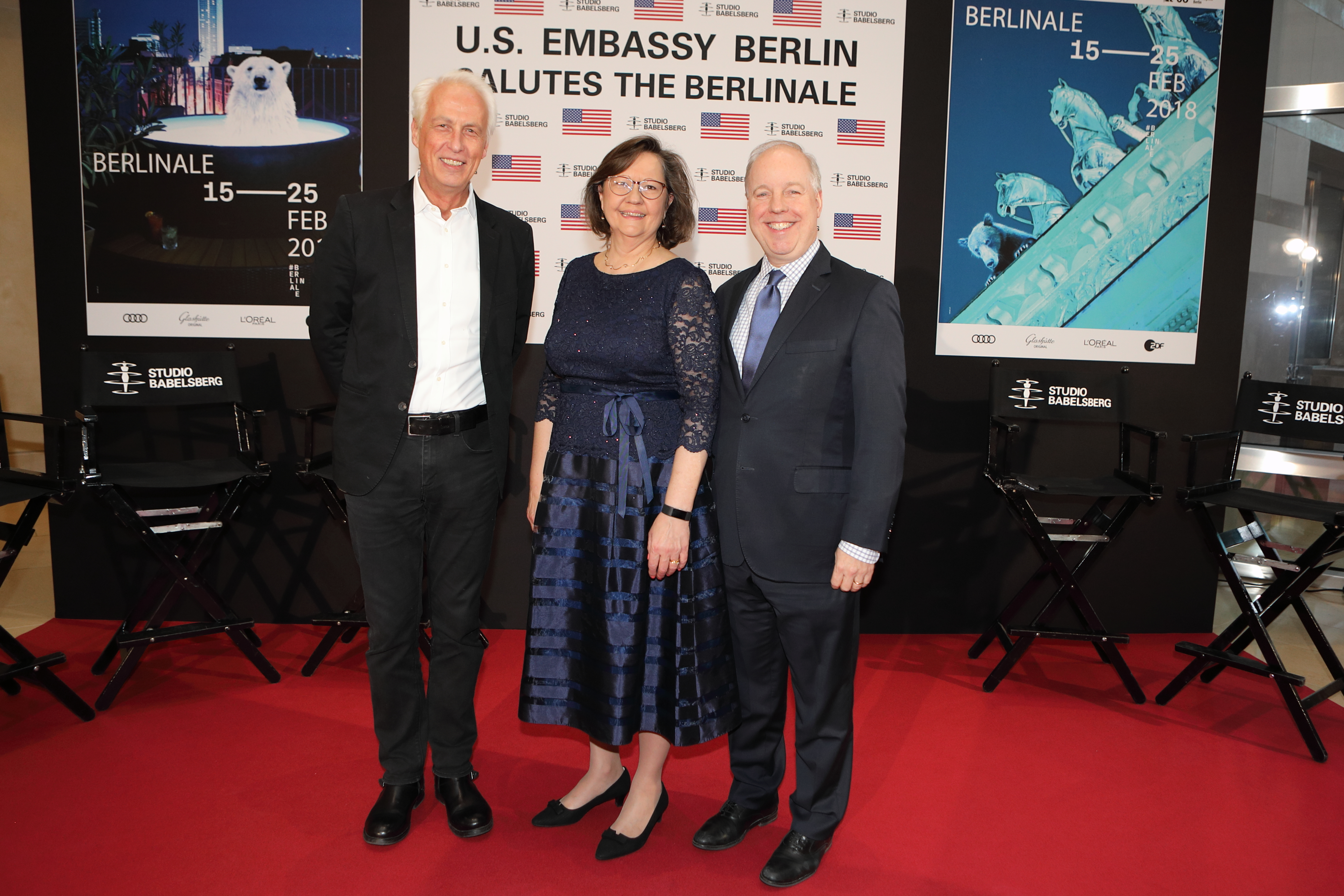
- Woebcken (left) at a Berlinale reception in 2018
- Other name: Charlie Woebcken
- Occupations: Film producer, media executive, and entrepreneur

Carl L. Woebcken, also known as Charlie Woebcken, is a German film producer, media executive and entrepreneur. From 2004 until the end of 2023, he served as chairman of the management board of Studio Babelsberg AG and as managing director of Studio Babelsberg Motion Pictures GmbH. Together with Christoph Fisser, he acquired Studio Babelsberg from the French media group Vivendi in 2004 and took the company public on the Frankfurt Stock Exchange the following year. During his tenure, numerous international film and television productions were made at the Babelsberg studios.

== Early life and career ==
Woebcken studied mechanical engineering and began his professional career as a management consultant at the Boston Consulting Group. He subsequently became a member of the management team at Roland Berger.

In 1998, he moved into the film and media industry. He became vice president of TV-Loonland AG in Munich and simultaneously served as managing director of Sunbow Entertainment, then a Sony subsidiary, in New York. There, he was responsible for international business activities in children's and family entertainment.

As a producer, Woebcken was involved in the feature film Pettersson and Findus. From 2002 to 2004, he served as managing director responsible for programming at Berlin Animation Film GmbH and was a co-producer of the animated film Happily N'Ever After.

In July 2004, Woebcken and Christoph Fisser acquired Studio Babelsberg from Vivendi. The acquisition marked the beginning of a strategic realignment of the historic film studio, which Woebcken headed as chairman of the management board of Studio Babelsberg AG until his departure at the end of 2023.

== Studio Babelsberg ==
In July 2004, Woebcken and Christoph Fisser acquired Studio Babelsberg from the French media group Vivendi. The following year, they took the company public as Studio Babelsberg AG on the Frankfurt Stock Exchange. Under Woebcken and Fisser, Studio Babelsberg expanded its activities as an international production services company for film and television. The company increased its studio capacity and technical services and worked with international production companies and major U.S. film studios. During Woebcken's tenure, numerous German and international productions were made at Babelsberg, including V for Vendetta, Casino Royale, The Reader, Inglourious Basterds, The Grand Budapest Hotel, Bridge of Spies, Homeland, The French Dispatch, The Matrix Resurrections, John Wick: Chapter 4 and The Hunger Games: The Ballad of Songbirds & Snakes. According to Studio Babelsberg, productions made at the studio since 2000 had received a total of 48 Academy Award nominations and 15 Academy Awards by 2022. Woebcken repeatedly advocated for improving the international competitiveness of Germany as a film production location. He supported reliable film funding mechanisms and tax incentives aimed at attracting and retaining international film and television productions in Germany. At the end of 2021, Woebcken and Fisser sold their majority stake in Studio Babelsberg AG to TPG Real Estate Partners. They subsequently remained with the company during its integration into the international studio group Cinespace Studios. Both left the management board of Studio Babelsberg AG effective 31 December 2023.

== Film industry involvement ==
Alongside his work as a producer and media executive, Woebcken has been active in organizations representing the German film industry.

From 2006 to 2012 and again from 2021 until 14 October 2024, he served on the board of the Verband Technischer Betriebe für Film und Fernsehen (VTFF), where he was responsible for political affairs. After leaving the board, he was named an honorary member of the association.

Woebcken is also a member of the board of trustees of the Film University Babelsberg KONRAD WOLF.

== Selected credits ==
The following production credits are listed by filmportal.de:

=== Producer ===
- Happy People: A Year in the Taiga (2010)
- Heart of Stone (2016)
- Dream Factory (2019)

=== Co-producer ===
- V for Vendetta (2005)
- The Counterfeiters (2007)
- Flame & Citron (2008)
- Speed Racer (2008)
- The Reader (2008)
- The International (2009)
- Inglourious Basterds (2009)
- The Ghost Writer (2010)
- Unknown (2011)
- Anonymous (2011)
- The Book Thief (2013)
- The Monuments Men (2014)
- Bridge of Spies (2015)
- Eddie the Eagle (2016)
- Renegades (2017)
- Isle of Dogs (2018)
- Gunpowder Milkshake (2021)
- The Matrix Resurrections (2021)
- Retribution (2023)
- John Wick: Chapter 4 (2023)
- The Hunger Games: The Ballad of Songbirds & Snakes (2023)
- Baghead (2023)
- Role Play (2024)

=== Executive producer ===
- Black Book (2006)
- In Darkness (2011)
- The Grand Budapest Hotel (2014)
- The Voices (2014)
- Men & Chicken (2015)
- A Hidden Life (2019)
- Tides (2021)
- The French Dispatch (2021)
- Asteroid City (2023)
- Traumnovelle (2024)
