= 10-9-8 =

Single by Face to Face

from the album Face to Face
- B-side: "Out of My Hands"
- Released: 1984
- Recorded: 1984
- Length: 3:53
- Label: Epic
- Songwriter: Angelo Petraglia
- Producers: Arthur Baker; Dick Wingate

Face to Face singles chronology
"10-9-8" (1984)	"Under the Gun" (1984)

Music video
- "10-9-8" on YouTube

"10-9-8" is the debut single by Face to Face, originally released in 1984 in the United States. It spent fifteen weeks on the Billboard Hot 100, debuting at number 80 the week of June 2, 1984 and peaking at number 38 the weeks of July 21 and 28 and August 4, 1984. It also reached number seven on the dance chart.

== Track listing ==
12" Epic AS 1823

1. "10-9-8" – 3:53
2. "Out of My Hands" – 4:46
