= Erica Muhl =

American composer and conductor (born 1961)

Erica Muhl (born October 26, 1961) is an American composer and conductor who was the president of Berklee College of Music until July 24, 2023. She formerly served as dean of the USC Jimmy Iovine and Andre Young Academy, and was previously dean of the University of Southern California Roski School of Art and Design before being accused of “strategic dismantlement of a formerly renowned studio arts program” by the 2015 graduating class. She received an Award in Music from the American Academy of Arts and Letters in 1999.

== Early life ==
Erica Muhl grew up in Los Angeles, where her father Edward Muhl was the head of Universal Pictures from 1953 to 1973, and her mother, Barbara, an author and opera singer. She trained as both a composer and a conductor, with much of her studies completed in Europe. At sixteen she was invited to take part in private composition studies with Nadia Boulanger in Paris.

She returned to the United States from Europe, completing a Bachelor of Music in composition at California State University, Northridge, but upon completion, she once again traveled while undergoing graduate studies at the Accademia di Santa Cecilia in Rome and the Accademia Chigiana in Siena. She studied conducting in Los Angeles with Fritz Zweig. This was followed by the completion of a Doctorate of Musical Arts at the University of Southern California in 1991.

== Career ==
Muhl's elegy for string orchestra Disinherited Souls, in remembrance of the victims of the Shoah, was commissioned by the New Jewish Chamber Philharmonic Dresden. Its premiere was at the Rykestrasse Synagogue in Prenzlauer Berg, Berlin, in November 2010.

Another commission, Burn the Box, also premiered in 2010, at a private gala in celebration of the inauguration of USC president C. L. Max Nikias. Further recent premieres have included the concert overture Smoke and Mirrors, for large orchestra, conducted in Los Angeles by the Memphis Symphony's music director, Mei-Ann Chen; and two new chamber works. 2009 saw the Dresden and Berlin premieres of her Trucco for String Orchestra. In 2005, the premiere of her chamber work, ...to a Thin Edge (commissioned and performed by the Orchestra of St. Luke's in New York City) was performed. Other recent appearances include the premiere of her symphonic work, Fleet, which she conducted at Disney Concert Hall in Los Angeles as part of the Los Angeles Philharmonic's "Sounds About Town" series.

Muhl has served as assistant conductor for Los Angeles Opera Theater, for Seattle Opera's regular season, and the Seattle Pacific Northwest Wagner Festival's complete Der Ring des Nibelungen.

In 2015, two years into her tenure as Dean of the Roski School of Art & Design, the entire graduate class of 2016 (seven students) withdrew from the school's MFA program, accusing Muhl's administration of "dismantling" the faculty, curriculum, program structure and strong support for graduate studies that had been hallmarks of the program. Curriculum changes in the program have been blamed for the departure of at least one tenured faculty member. Muhl issued a response in the school's website saying she was saddened by the students' decision to leave the program over issues the school considered to have been resolved. On July 16, 2015, the school's MFA class of 2015 published an open letter to the university president, provost, and board of trustees calling for the removal of Erica Muhl as Dean of the Roski School of Art & Design.

In May 2013, while serving as Dean of the USC Roski School of Art and Design, Muhl was appointed founding director of the USC Jimmy Iovine and Andre Young Academy for Arts, Technology and the Business of Innovation. The academy was named USC's 20th professional school in spring of 2018, and Muhl was appointed Dean of the academy in July of that same year. In October 2019, USC officially opened Iovine and Young Hall, the school's permanent home.

In October 2020, Muhl was named the new president of Berklee College of Music, beginning her term in July 2021. In June 2023, she took a leave of absence for an indefinite moment in time with an interim president in her place. On July 24, 2023, it was announced that Muhl would not be returning to Berklee as president.

== Recordings ==
- Range of Light: Selected Chamber Works by Erica Muhl Cleveland Chamber Symphony conducted by Erica Muhl and Erik Forrester Albany TROY 667 08G092 (2004)
