= Wege (surname) =

Wege is a surname. Notable people with the surname include:

- Bud VanDeWege (born 1958), American basketball coach
- Cordelia Wege (born 1976), German actress
- Gary van der Wege (born 1955), American wheelchair fencer
- Juliet Wege (born 1971), Australian botanist
- Kevin Van De Wege (born 1974), American firefighter and politician
