= Face to Face (new wave band) =

American New Wave band of the 1970s/1980s

- Origin: New Hampshire, United States
- Genres: Pop, new wave
- Years active: 1979–1988
- Labels: Epic, PolyGram
- Past members: Laurie Sargent; Stuart Kimball; Angelo Petraglia; John Ryder; Billy Beard

Face to Face was an American new wave quintet from Boston, Massachusetts, United States.

== Formation ==
Guitarist Stuart Kimball (born December 21, 1956) formed the band with close friends in New Hampshire during the late 1970s. The lineup was Laurie Sargent on vocals, Kimball on guitars and keyboards, Angelo Petraglia (identified on their albums simply as 'Angelo') on guitars and keyboards, John Ryder on bass and Billy Beard on drums.

They moved to Boston in 1980 and played there until signing with Epic in 1982. The band's biggest hit was "10-9-8" (from their self-titled first album), which peaked at No. 38 on the Billboard Hot 100 the week ending July 20, 1984.

== Breakup of the band ==
After performing as a band for less than 10 years they disbanded in 1988 approximately one year after switching labels to PolyGram Records. Sargent went on to record as a solo artist, and is currently lead singer for the band Twinemen with former members of Face to Face and Morphine. Beard is a music booker at Toad and Lizard Lounge in Cambridge, Massachusetts, where he plays with Session Americana. Kimball plays guitar as a member of Bob Dylan's band in the Never Ending Tour. Petraglia won a Grammy in 2010 for Record of the Year as the Kings of Leon's producer, a band for which he also assists with songwriting duties. Ryder still plays in Boston, doing fundraisers as a founding member of the James Montgomery & Friends band, who were nominated for a Boston Music Award in 2003, and has been working for the Philips corporation for over 10 years.

== Discography ==
Albums:

- Face to Face (1984)
- Confrontation (1985)
- One Big Day (1988)

Singles:

- "Under the Gun" (1984)
- "10-9-8" (1984) - US Hot 100 #38
- "Tell Me Why" (1985)
- "Window to the World" (from the Jumpin' Jack Flash soundtrack) (1986)
