= Julia – Wege zum Glück =

- Country of origin: Germany

Julia – Wege zum Glück is a German television series. After Chapter 250 the title was changed into Wege zum Glück.

== See also ==
- List of German television series
