= Myxer =

Internet radio company

- Website type: Free internet radio, ringtones
- Available in: English
- Headquarters: Austin, Texas, U.S.
- Owners: Myxer, Inc
- Website: myxer.fm
- Registration: Optional
- Launched: 2005
- Current status: Inactive

Myxer was a streaming internet radio company founded in Deerfield Beach, Florida, in 2005. It was a free service that allowed customers to fine-tune their music tastes by artist and song, providing "Listener Controlled Radio". In addition to offering access to 20 million songs, Myxer also provided access to a large catalog of downloadable content. Myxer was available on the web, mobile web, and via specialized smartphone apps for Android and iOS.

== History ==
Myxer was founded in 2005 by Myk Willis in Deerfield Beach, Florida. Most of the early employees of the company, including co-founders Scott Kinnear, Scott Clark, and Bill Madden, had worked together previously at Citrix Systems, a Fort Lauderdale, Florida-based technology company.

In 2006, it received $100,000, and by 2007, the company earned $300,000. In 2009, Myxer has 27 million users, and the next year it was among Google's top 10 fastest growing searches both in the US and abroad. In 2012, Founder and CEO Myk Willis left the company, which subsequently moved its headquarters to Austin, Texas.

== Products ==
Myxer was launched in 2005, originally allowing users to create their own ringtones by uploading their own song files to Myxer's website, where they could then edit them and send a properly-formatted ringtone to their phone. The service was later enhanced to allow artists to make their own ringtones available to others, both on the Myxer site as well as on other sites such as MySpace using a proprietary widget technology called MyxerTags.

Myxer Social Radio was launched in late 2011. This product allowed users to share a music experience by listening to streaming personalized music simultaneously with their friends on the web or on their mobile device. Myxer Social Radio also included features such as music chat and video song stories. In 2012, the Myxer Social Radio service won the 2012 MTV Music Award for "Most Addictive Social Radio.”

Myxer was re-launched In 2013. This product consolidated new Internet radio features such as artist and song control along with downloadable content into a single web service, Android, and iOS app. The new product allows users to customize, download and listen to and create free online radio stations with artist and song-level editing control.

The company also operated the Myxer Music Network reaching 16+ Million Monthly Unique Visitors (mostly mobile), providing digital ad products for advertisers for genre or artist based targeting across music services including: Slacker, Jango, Tunewiki, Songza, and Myxer.

== Supported Carriers and Devices ==
Myxer supported downloads and streaming to a wide variety of mobile devices, including most Android and iOS phones and tablets.

== Bankruptcy ==
Myxer filed for Chapter 7 bankruptcy in August 2014.
