= Wege zum Glück =

- Genre: Telenovela
- Created by: Gavin Strawhan
- No. of seasons: 4
- No. of episodes: 789

Production
- Producer: Rainer Wemcken
- Production locations: Babelsberg, Potsdam, Brandenburg
- Running time: 42 minutes
- Production company: Grundy UFA TV Produktions GmbH

Original release
- Network: ZDF
- Release: October 6, 2005 – February 24, 2009

Related
- Bianca – Wege zum Glück

Wege zum Glück (English: Ways to Happiness) is a German telenovela. The show was starting on October 6, 2005, on ZDF and originally was planned to have 250 chapters. Later the concept was changed and the title became a label to tell different love stories in telenovela-style. After 789 chapters, the network decided to cancel the show. The last episode aired on February 24, 2009.

ZDF decided to end the show after ratings declined from season to season. Unable to find a successful replacement, the network announced in January 2012 that a deal was made with the production company Grundy UFA to reactivate the Wege zum Glück series. The melodramatic stories were also shown in Austria, Switzerland and Italy.

== Overview ==
=== Season 1 ===
Chapter 1 - Chapter 250: (Julia – Wege zum Glück) Julia Schilling meets Daniel Gravenberg on a tour in South Africa and they eventually start to fall for each other. But then Julia has to flee together with her troubled mother Christa. They get back to Germany and Julia thinks that she lost Daniel forever. Penniless, Julia tries to start a new life in the fictional town Falkental and begins working at a porcelain manufactory. She first does not know that Daniel is the junior executive at the company. After many complications and schemes from Daniel's mother Annabelle, the pair get their happy end.

=== Season 2 ===
Chapter 251 - Chapter 500: Nina Bergmann is a single parent after her husband Max van Weyden went missing on a Photo Safari. Nina tried to find him, but in the end had to flee to her aunt Birgit Hertel, who lives in Falkental. She meets Julia's half brother Ben Petersen and falls in love with him after they work closely together in the manufactory. Eventually Nina has to fight for custody over her daughter as Annabelle's new husband Richard van Weyden, Max' father, does not think she's a responsible parent. As Annabelle has to fight against the rejection of Richard's daughter Viktoria, Nina finds a rival Elsa Ritter for Ben's heart just as Max returns into their lives. In the end, Nina and Ben get married and leave for their honeymoon in the Caribbean.

=== Season 3 ===
Chapter 501 - Chapter 703: Luisa Maywald comes together with her adoptive sister Nora to Falkental to search for her biological mother. Someday she runs into Simon Becker and realizes that he possesses her old talisman. Luisa gets into his atelier to get it back and is caught by Simon. As Luisa tries to get away she destroys a stature, who hits Simon's head. As Luisa runs off to get help, Nora gets to Simon and eventually turns up as a romantic rival for Simon's heart. After Nora finds out that Annabelle is her biological mother, she becomes part of her schemes and is used by Annabelle. In the end, Nora faces prison for a crime her mother committed and Luisa ends up marrying Simon. They leave Falkental behind and start a new life with their son Moritz in New Zealand.

=== Season 4 ===
Chapter 704 - Chapter 789: Before the new season starts, chapters 704 to 710 focus on other storylines of the residents in Falkental. After that the audience sees Nora and how she tries to escape from a prison hospital. She flees to Hamburg and meets Alexander Wagner. The two spend an unforgettable day together, before Nora has to take a six-year sentence in prison. After six years, Nora and Alexander meet again on her birthday and she tells him her life story. They eventually discover that they are siblings and that their love is impossible. Caught between love and taboo, Nora and Alexander are unable to resist each other. After it is proven that they are not brother and sister after all, the two get married while Annabelle is finally paying for her crimes. As she escapes from police custody, Annabelle decides to take her own life.

== Cast ==
Actor	Role	Episodes	Years
Susanne Gärtner	Julia Gravenberg, née Schilling	1–303	2005–2007
Susanne Häusler	Christa Schilling	1–120; 236–250	2005–2006
Roman Rossa	Daniel Gravenberg	1–303	2005–2007
Holger C. Gotha	Frederik Gravenberg	1–270; 705–789	2005–2006; 2008–2009
Isa Jank	Annabelle Gravenberg, née Krüger, divorced van Weyden †	1–732; 734	2005–2008
Karin Ugowski	Eva Landmann	1–789	2005–2009
Michael Rast	Jörg Schwarz †	1–234	2005–2006
Friedhelm Ptok	Werner Gravenberg †	1–131; 137; 171–178	2005–2006
Ralph Schicha	Tobias Becker	1–738	2005–2008
Lucie Muhr	Patrizia Gravenberg	1–321	2005–2007
Angela Sandritter	Silke Mertens	1–462	2005–2007
Kaya Marie Möller	Lilly Gerlach, née Becker	1–412	2005–2007
Nicolas Artajo	Kolja Hertel	1–452	2005–2007
Anton Nouri	Andreas Krill †	1–110	2005–2006
Christoph Kornschober	Niko Becker	3–321	2005–2007
Stefan Mocker	Jan Schönke	5–276	2005–2006
Leander Modersohn	Tim Gerlach	13–412	2005–2007
Sonja Baum	Marie Vermont	44–218	2005–2006
Lina Rabea Mohr	Charlotte „Charlie“ Vermont	69–344	2006–2007
Michèle Marian	Birgit Hertel	112–500	2006–2007
Nicola Ransom	Katy Wellinghoff, née Neubauer	178–211	2006
Gisa Zach	Nina Petersen, née Bergmann	216–500	2006–2007
Nicole Mercedes Müller	Paula Bergmann #1	216–500	2006–2007
Mareile Bettina Moeller	Viktoria „Vicky“ van Weyden †	222–493	2006–2007
Peter Zimmermann	Richard van Weyden	231–789	2006–2009
Hubertus Grimm	Benjamin „Ben“ Petersen	239–500	2006–2007
Jens Peter Nünemann	Hagen Ritter	245–633	2006–2008
Sebastian Edtbauer	Erik Landmann †	281–477	2006–2007
Bernhard Reininger	Stefan Krill	326–462	2007
Corinna A. Horn	Elsa Landmann, née Ritter	333–789	2007–2009
Silke Matthias	Helena van Weyden, née Bernstein †	339–612	2007–2008
Jost Pieper	Maximilian „Max“ van Weyden	348–442	2007
Birte Wentzek	Meike Becker, née Hansen	350–733	2007–2008
Lisa Spickschen	Elisabeth „Lizzy“ van Weyden	412–690	2007–2008
Markus Frank	Konrad Landmann	457–789	2007–2009
William Mang	Harald Becker †	466–588	2007–2008
Heike Schroetter	Marianne Becker	466–738	2007–2008
Susanne Berckhemer	Luisa Becker, née Maywald	469–703	2007–2008
Anja Boche	Nora Wagner, née Krüger, adopted Maywald, accepted van Weyden	469–789	2007–2009
David Kramer	Simon Becker	476–703	2007–2008
Günter Bubbnik	Sebastian Becker	503–733	2007–2008
Markus Baumeister	Henning Reichenbach	508–712	2007–2008
Katrin Griesser	Sophie Nowak	513–789	2007–2009
Hans-Jochen Röhrig	Ludwig Adam	548–789	2008–2009
Marvin Jaacks	Theo Gehrmann #1	638–713	2008
Armin Schlagwein	Tom Nowak	693–789	2008–2009
Kaja Schmidt-Tychsen	Constanze Becker	702–789	2008–2009
Marijam Agischewa	Judith Wagner	707–789	2008–2009
Timo Hübsch	Alexander Wagner	709–789	2008–2009
Steven Merting	Michael Adam †	711–784	2008–2009
Bela Klentze	Theo Landmann, adopted, née Gehrmann #2	714–789	2008–2009
Christina Athenstädt	Jessica Fuchs	725–788	2008–2009
Jennifer Breitrück	Paula Bergmann #2	733–789	2008–2009
