= Bianca – Wege zum Glück =

- Country of origin: Germany

Bianca – Wege zum Glück (Bianca – Ways to Happiness) was the first German telenovela, developed by the TV production company Grundy UFA. It started on 1 November 2004 and ran until 5 October 2005 on the ZDF. The main characters were Bianca Berger, played by Tanja Wedhorn, and Oliver Wellinghoff, played by Patrik Fichte.

== International broadcasters ==
Country	Network
Germany	ZDF
Austria	ORF
Switzerland	SRF
Italy	Rete 4
Poland	TBD
Estonia	Kanal 2

== See also ==
- List of German television series
