= Jim Mitteager =

American journalist

James J. Mitteager (17 July 1946 – 24 July 1997) was an American journalist who worked for several tabloid newspapers and covered numerous high-profile incidents.

== Life and career ==
In 1973 Mitteager worked for the New York City Police Department before becoming a journalist. In 1979 while working as a freelance writer for the New York Post, Mitteager was acquitted on charges that he had bribed a correction officer to obtain photographs and information about murderer David Berkowitz.

In 1989, Mitteager helped The National Enquirer scoop People in getting the first photo of Riley Keough, oldest grandchild of Elvis Presley and Priscilla Presley.
