= You Ain't Seen Nothin' Yet =

"You Ain't Seen Nothin' Yet" and similar can refer to:

== Film ==
- You Ain't Seen Nothin' Yet (film) (original title Vous n'avez encore rien vu), a 2012 French-German film directed by Alain Resnais

== Music ==
=== Albums ===
- You Ain't Seen Nothing Yet (album), a 1983 Bachman-Turner Overdrive compilation album named after and containing the Bachman-Turner Overdrive song

=== Songs ===
- "You Ain't Seen Nothing Yet" (Bachman–Turner Overdrive song), 1974
- "You Ain't Seen Nothin' Yet", a song by Burton Cummings from the 1976 album Burton Cummings
- "You Ain't Seen Nothin' Yet" (Lisa Marie Presley song), 2012
- "You Ain't Seen Nothin' Yet", a song by Small Faces from the 1978 album 78 in the Shade
- "You Ain't Seen Nothin' Yet", a 1965 single by The Bobbettes
- "You Ain't Seen Nothin' Yet", a song by The Icicle Works from the 1985 album The Small Price of a Bicycle
- "You Ain't Seen Nothin' Yet", a song by Avril Lavigne from the 2013 self-titled album

== See also ==
- "(We Ain't Got) Nothin' Yet", a 1966 song by the Blues Magoos
- "You ain't heard nothing yet!", a catchphrase popularized by Al Jolson, also used in the movie The Jazz Singer
