= Presley Charitable Foundation =

American foundation

The Presley Foundation is a 501(c)(3) non-profit philanthropic public benefit, grantmaking foundation created by Lisa Marie Presley as Presley Charitable Foundation 501(c)(3) in August 2007. Updated on May 6, 2013, September 9, 2018, and December 2020 by adding Elaine Elizabeth Presley, reincorporated from 501(c)(3) Presley Charitable Foundation to 501(c)(3) The Presley Foundation Inc, on November 10, 2022, and registered with the Tennessee charity commission on 02/13/2023. The first endeavor of The Presley Foundation will be Presley Place-New Orleans; a transitional housing facility for homeless families. The foundation provides rent-free housing, child day care, career, and financial counseling, family management guidance, and other tools which help people learn how no longer be homeless again. Through this process, they gain self-esteem and independence.

The first Presley Place in Memphis, Tennessee, is a multi-unit apartment. It is one of several such properties or "campuses" in Memphis that are part of the Estival Communities program, created and managed by the Metropolitan Inter-faith Association (MIFA). Presley Place-Memphis opened the doors to its first residents in July 2001 and will serve as the model for Presley Place-New Orleans.

In 2007 Lisa Marie Presley recorded a duet of "In the Ghetto" with her Father, Elvis Presley, which reached #1 on iTunes in Canada, the UK, Australia, Ireland, Germany, and New Zealand. She was in the top 5 in other countries. Proceeds from the sale of this song and video, directed by Tony Kaye, went directly to The Presley Foundation. Referring to the 30th anniversary of her father's death, Lisa Marie Presley told Spinner: "I wanted to use this for something good". Of her posthumous "In the Ghetto" duet with Elvis Presley, she said: "All fingers pointed towards New Orleans." She filmed the video in the hurricane-ravaged city.

The Presley Foundation is a 501c3 charitable organization.
