= From Here to the Great Unknown =

2024 memoir by Lisa Marie Presley and Riley Keough

- Authors: Lisa Marie Presley; Riley Keough
- Language: English
- Genre: Memoir
- Published: October 8, 2024
- Publisher: Random House
- Publication place: United States
- Pages: 304
- ISBN: 978-0593733875

From Here to the Great Unknown is a memoir by Lisa Marie Presley written with her daughter, Riley Keough. It was published by Pan MacMillan, as well as Random House, on October 8, 2024. Presley asked Keough to assist her with the writing of the memoir in 2022, shortly before her death. Keough completed the book from audio tapes that Presley had recorded. The book recalls Presley's relationship with her father, Elvis Presley, her relationships with Michael Jackson and Danny Keough and her struggles with addiction.

== Conception ==
Keough revealed the existence of the tapes in January 2024; she said that she had completed transcribing the tapes in the form of a book. Keough also revealed that she completed writing the details on the tapes in book form following her mother's death. In addition to preparing the memoir, Keough is also the narrator of the audiobook, which includes "never-before-heard recollections" through Presley's voice. The title and cover were revealed on June 4, 2024; the cover features a photo of a young Presley with her father. Presley and Keough are co-credited as the authors of the book. In addition to Keough, Julia Roberts would co-narrate the audiobook, performing Lisa Marie Presley's passages.

== Reception ==
Writing for The New York Times, Elisabeth Egan positively reviewed the book, noting the depth of its observations about the Presley family. Those observations include passage about addiction and suicide. According to Egan, "these passages show how determined [Lisa] was to stand up to her demons". In The Washington Post, Allison Stewart also praised the depth the memoir went in describing moments, including struggles, in Presley's personal life, noting how Presley detailed her "disintegration" and fights against "addiction and grief". The memoir was chosen as an Oprah's book club pick.

== Commercial performance ==
From Here to the Great Unknown topped Apple Books' U.S. best sellers list for the week ending October 14, 2024. Its audiobook would top the audiobook list as well. It also topped Amazon's best sellers chart for the week ending October 13. On the New York Times Best Sellers list, it would rank No. 2. For the week ending October 21, 2024, the book's ranking on Apple Book's U.S. best sellers list would fall to No. 9. However, its audiobook would be ranked much higher at No. 2.
