= Lisa Marie Presley =

American singer-songwriter (1968–2023)

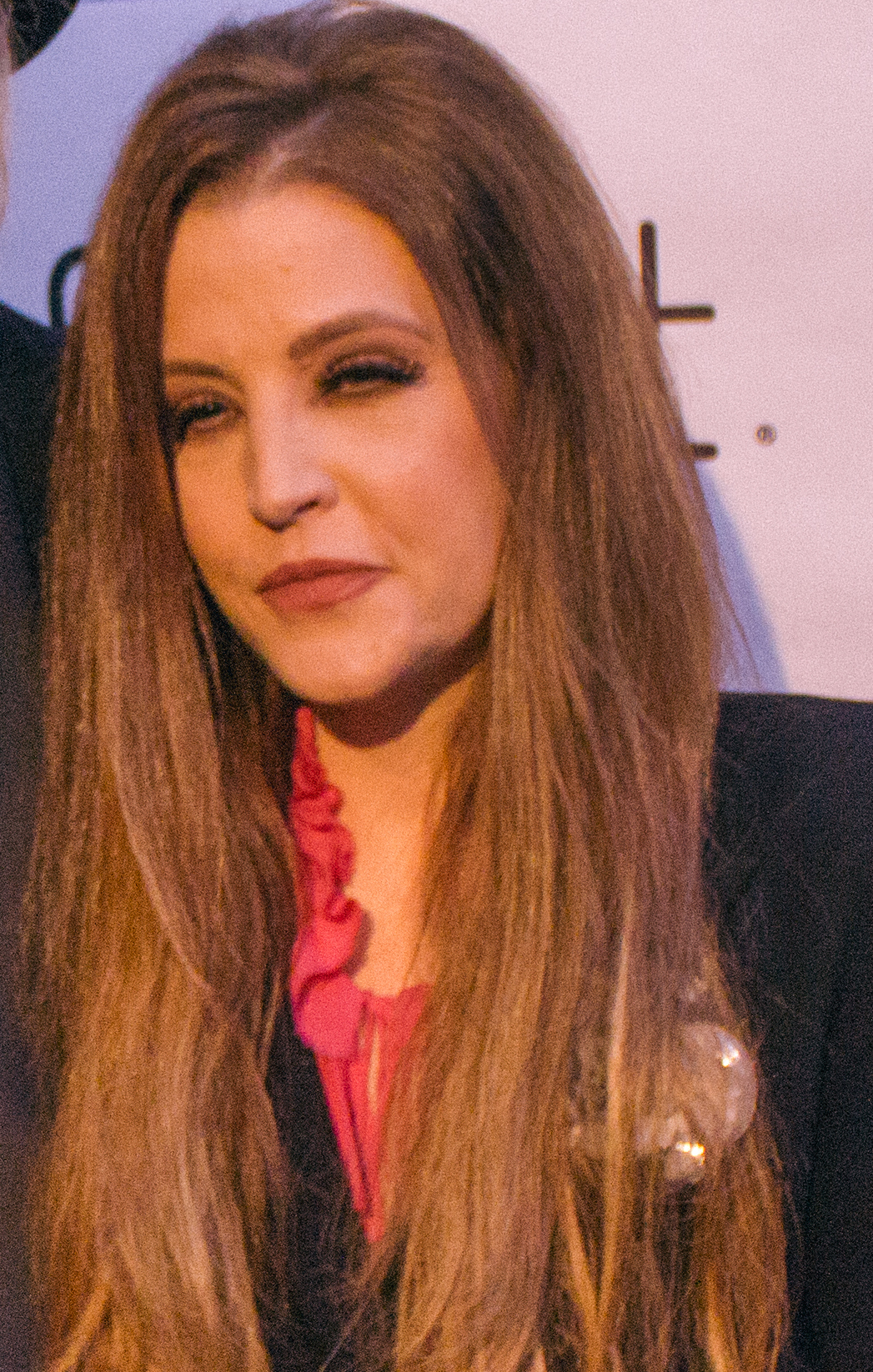
- Presley in 2014
- Born: February 1, 1968; Memphis, Tennessee, U.S.
- Died: January 12, 2023 (aged 54); Los Angeles, California, U.S.
- Resting place: Graceland, Memphis
- Other names: Lisa Marie Presley Keough; Lisa Marie Presley-Jackson
- Occupations: Singer; songwriter
- Years active: 1997–2023
- Spouses: Danny Keough (m. 1988; div. 1994); Michael Jackson (m. 1994; div. 1996); Nicolas Cage (m. 2002; div. 2004); Michael Lockwood (m. 2006; div. 2021)
- Children: 4, including Riley
- Parents: Elvis Presley; Priscilla Presley
- Relatives: Navarone Garibaldi (half-brother)
- Musical career
- Genres: Soft rock; alternative; folk; pop rock; contemporary; Americana
- Instrument: Vocals
- Website: lisamariepresley.com

Lisa Marie Presley (February 1, 1968 – January 12, 2023) was an American singer-songwriter. The daughter of singer and actor Elvis Presley and actress Priscilla Presley, she became the sole heir to her father's estate following the deaths of her grandfather and great-grandmother. Presley was also known for her marriage to Michael Jackson, which lasted from 1994 to 1996.

Presley released three studio albums—To Whom It May Concern (2003), Now What (2005), and Storm & Grace (2012). To Whom It May Concern was certified gold by the Recording Industry Association of America. She also released several non-album singles, including posthumous duets with her father created from archival recordings. Presley's memoir, From Here to the Great Unknown, completed by her daughter Riley Keough, was published posthumously in October 2024.

== Early life ==
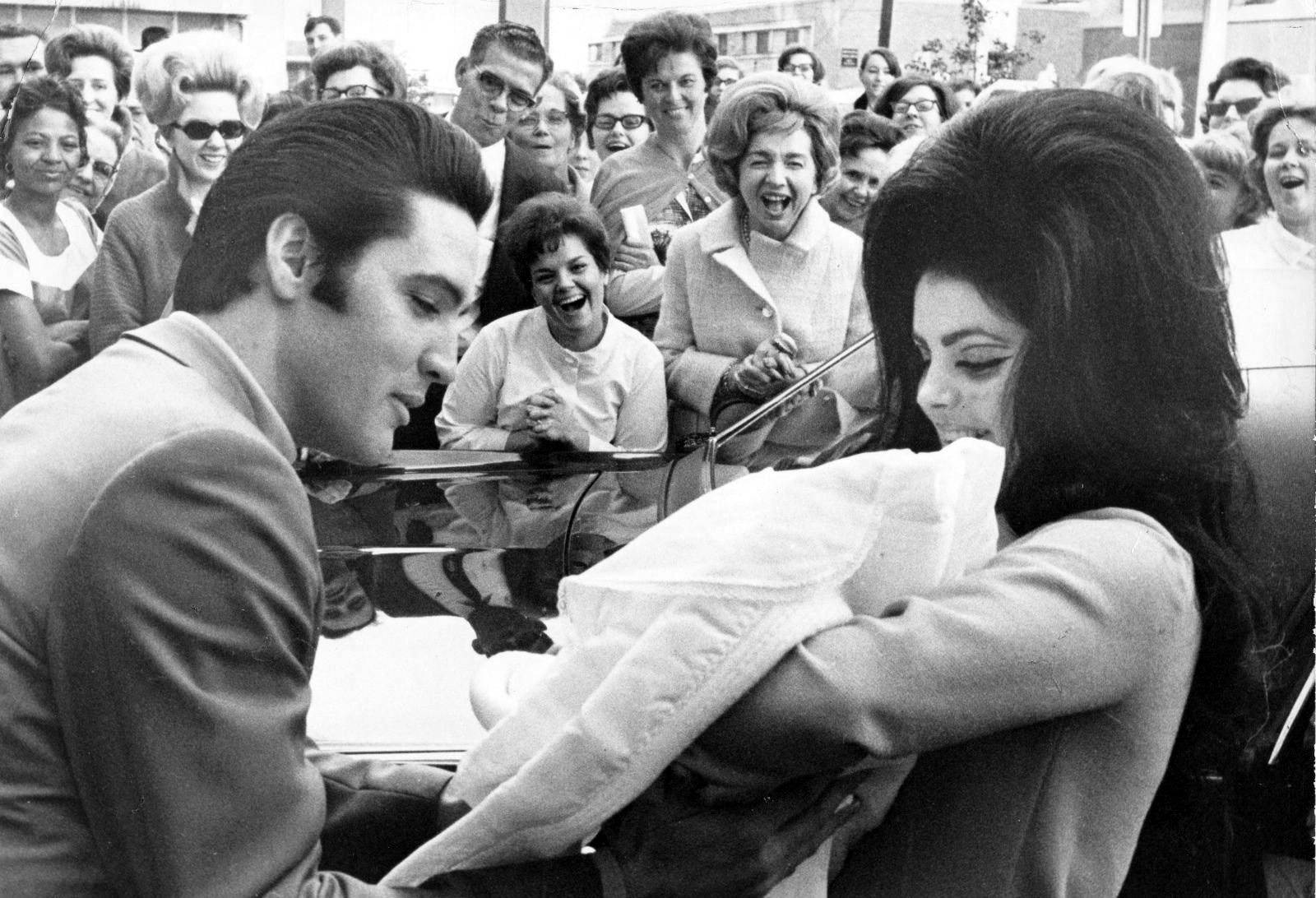
Elvis and Priscilla with newborn Lisa Marie, 1968

Lisa Marie Presley was born on February 1, 1968, at Baptist Memorial Hospital-Memphis in Memphis, Tennessee, the only child of Elvis and Priscilla Presley. She was born nine months to the day after her parents' wedding.

When Presley was four years old, her parents separated, and their divorce was finalized in October 1973. She lived with her mother in Los Angeles and frequently stayed with her father at Graceland in Memphis. When Elvis died in August 1977, nine-year-old Presley became a joint heir to his estate along with her 61-year-old grandfather, Vernon Presley, and her 87-year-old great-grandmother Minnie Mae (Hood) Presley. Through Vernon, she was a descendant of the Harrison family of Virginia. After the deaths of her grandfather in 1979 and her great-grandmother the following year, Presley became Elvis' sole heir. On her 25th birthday in 1993, Presley inherited the estate, which had grown to an estimated $100 million. She sold 85 percent of Elvis Presley Enterprises in 2004.

In the late 1970s, a year or two after her father's death, Presley attended her first rock concert when she saw Queen at The Forum in Inglewood, California. After the show, Presley gave Freddie Mercury one of Elvis' scarves and expressed her appreciation for theatrical performance.

Shortly after Elvis' death, Priscilla began a relationship with actor Michael Edwards. In a 2003 interview with Playboy, Presley said that Edwards would enter her room while intoxicated and behave in a sexually inappropriate manner toward her. In From Here to the Great Unknown, Presley repeated the allegation and stated that Edwards sexually assaulted her beginning in 1978.

Presley had a half-brother, Navarone Garibaldi, from Priscilla's 22-year relationship with Marco Garibaldi.

In 1997, Presley recorded a video for "Don't Cry Daddy" as a posthumous duet with Elvis. This video was presented on August 16, that year, at the tribute concert marking the 20th anniversary of his death. It features Elvis' original vocal track with new instrumentation and Lisa Marie's added vocals.

== Career ==
=== 2003–2005: To Whom It May Concern ===
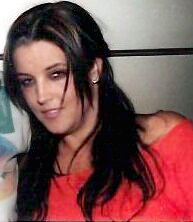
Presley in 2003

Presley released her debut album, To Whom It May Concern, on April 8, 2003. It reached No. 5 on the Billboard 200 albums chart and was certified gold in June 2003. She wrote all the lyrics (except "The Road Between", which she co-wrote with Gus Black) and co-wrote every melody. To promote the album, Presley presented a concert in the UK. The album's first single, "Lights Out", reached No. 18 on the Billboard Hot Adult Top 40 chart and No. 16 on the UK charts. She collaborated with Billy Corgan on a co-written track titled "Savior", which was included as the B-side. In his review of the album, Los Angeles Times critic Robert Hilburn wrote that it had "a stark, uncompromising tone" and that "Presley's gutsy blues-edged voice has a distinctive flair".

Pat Benatar and Presley performed at VH1 Divas Duets, a concert benefiting the VH1 Save the Music Foundation, held at the MGM Grand Garden Arena on May 22, 2003, in Las Vegas. Together, they sang Benatar's hit "Heartbreaker", which Presley frequently performed at her own concerts on later tours. That same year, she contributed a recording of "Silent Night" for the NBC Holiday Collection Sounds of the Season.

=== 2005–2012: Now What and further singles ===
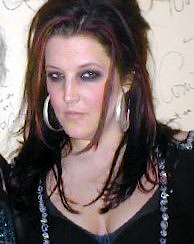
Presley in 2006

Presley's second album, Now What, was released on April 5, 2005, and reached No. 9 on the Billboard 200 albums chart. She co-wrote 10 songs and recorded covers of Don Henley's "Dirty Laundry" (the album's first single, which hit No. 36 on the Billboard 100 AC singles chart), and the Ramones' "Here Today and Gone Tomorrow". The song "Idiot" is a pointed critique of several men in her life. Unlike Presley's first album, Now What carried a Parental Advisory sticker. She also covered Blue Öyster Cult's "Burnin' for You" as a B-side, and Pink made a guest appearance on the track "Shine". The video for "Dirty Laundry" was directed by Patrick Hoelck and featured a cameo appearance by George Michael.

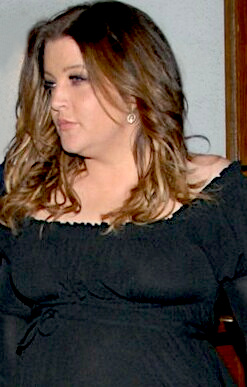
Presley in 2008

Too Tough to Die: A Tribute to Johnny Ramone, a documentary about Johnny Ramone of the Ramones, was released in 2006. Directed by Mandy Stein, the film features Deborah Harry, the Dickies, X, Eddie Vedder, Presley, and the Red Hot Chili Peppers as they stage a benefit concert to celebrate the Ramones' 30th anniversary and raise money for Cancer research.

Presley appeared in the music video for Johnny Cash's "God's Gonna Cut You Down" in 2006. Rick Rubin produced the record, and Tony Kaye directed the video, which featured multiple celebrities and won the 2008 Grammy Award for Best Short Form Music Video.

Presley's single "In the Ghetto" was released in August 2007 as a virtual duet with her father, who had originally recorded the song in 1969. It was released to commemorate the 30th anniversary of her father's death. The video, released simultaneously with the single, reached No. 1 on iTunes sales and No. 16 on Billboard's Bubbling Under Hot 100 singles chart. Proceeds from the single benefited the new Presley Place Transitional Housing Campus in New Orleans. Presley appeared on The Oprah Winfrey Show to perform the song with the Harlem Gospel Choir, using vintage footage of her father.

Presley joined singer Richard Hawley on stage in London in October 2009, performing vocals on a song the pair had been developing titled "Weary". Hawley sought to help Presley relaunch her music career, and the two began a songwriting partnership in which she wrote the lyrics and Hawley composed the music. In an interview with Oprah Winfrey, Presley said she was recording a new album in London, scheduled for released in 2011.

=== 2012–2018: Storm & Grace and final releases ===
Presley's third album, Storm & Grace, was released on May 15, 2012. She said, "It's much more of a rootsy record, organic record, than my previous work." The album was produced by Oscar and Grammy winner T Bone Burnett. AllMusic described it as "a stronger, more mature, and more effective work than one might have expected" and noted that "Presley is finally developing a musical personality that truly suits her". Spinner.com called it "the strongest album of her career" and Entertainment Weekly praised the "smoky, spooky" single "You Ain't Seen Nothing Yet". Burnett said of collaborating with Presley on Storm & Grace (2012): "When songs from Lisa Marie Presley showed up at my door, I was curious. I wondered what the daughter of an American revolutionary music artist had to say. What I heard was honest, raw, unaffected and soulful. I thought her father would be proud of her. The more I listened to the songs, the deeper an artist I found her to be. Listening beyond the media static, Lisa Marie Presley is a Southern American folk music artist of great value."

In 2018, Presley was featured on the title track of Where No One Stands Alone, a compilation of her father's gospel recordings. The song was reworked into a duet between Presley and her father. A music video was released in which Presley is digitally incorporated into scenes with Elvis.

=== Memoir ===
Prior to her death, Presley recorded a series of audio tapes for a memoir. Her daughter, Riley Keough, completed the manuscript using the material on those tapes following her mother's death. In addition to preparing the memoir, Riley narrated its audiobook version, which includes "Never-before-heard recollections" in Presley's own voice. The memoir, titled From Here to the Great Unknown, features a photograph of a young Presley with her father on the cover. Presley and Riley are both credited as the book's authors. From Here to the Great Unknown was released on October 8, 2024, through Random House.

== Charity work and humanitarian efforts ==
The Presley Charitable Foundation (PCF) was formed by Presley in 2007. It was reincorporated as the Presley Foundation Inc. on November 10, 2022, and registered as a public benefit and grantmaking foundation on February 13, 2023. In 2001, Presley Place opened to its first residents. Presley Place provides homeless families with up to one year of rent-free housing, child day care, career and financial counseling, family-management guidance, and other tools designed to help them break the cycle of poverty and regain self-esteem and independence. The PCF also funds the Elvis Presley Music Room, where the children of Presley Place and others have access to musical instruments, instruction, and related programs. Her father's foundation, the Elvis Presley Charitable Foundation, created the Elvis Presley Endowed Scholarship Fund at the College of Communication & Fine Arts at the University of Memphis to assist students majoring in the arts.

Presley joined Oprah Winfrey and her Angel Network and was active in the relief efforts after Hurricane Katrina devastated New Orleans and surrounding areas. She volunteered in Memphis, Tennessee. "I'm here", she said, "because I definitely needed to do something, and it just so happens this is where I'm from. I'm going to do everything I can. People need help—this is a huge catastrophe and everyone needs to stand up." Her first stop was a food bank, where, with the help of FedEx and Kroger, Presley loaded a truck with groceries. She then stopped at Target for toiletries and clothes. "I thought I was going to grab a couple things at the store", Presley said, "and I ended up filling up a truck. I went a little crazy."

Presley's final destination was the Grand Casino Convention Center in Mississippi, where she distributed supplies to people who had lost everything. One evacuee said, "I really appreciate everything Ms. Presley is doing for us. We have nothing, so we're very grateful for everything she's doing." In 2011, Presley became a patron of the Dream Factory, a charity based in Hainault, London.

=== Grammy Foundation ===
Presley was involved with the Grammy Foundation's Gold Grammy Signature Schools program, which recognizes U.S. public high schools that demonstrate an outstanding commitment to music education during an academic year. On October 22, 2005, she presented a special award to Isaac Hayes at the Memphis Recording Academy Honors. A host of hometown artists, including Presley, Justin Timberlake, Hayes, and David Porter, were recognized by the Memphis chapter of the Recording Academy. Presley and music producer Jimmy Jam jointly presented the award to Hayes.

On November 11, 2005, Presley participated in a Grammy SoundCheck at LA's House of Blues, where she and other industry professionals met with music students to discuss career opportunities within the music industry.

== Personal life ==
In 2005, Presley allowed the public a brief look into her personal life by appearing in the television film Elvis by the Presleys. Between 2010 and 2016, Presley lived in a 15th-century manor house in Rotherfield, East Sussex.

Presley publicly acknowledged her struggle with opioid addiction. She wrote the foreword to United States of Opioids: A Prescription for Liberating a Nation in Pain (2019), stating that she had been prescribed opioids following the birth of her twin daughters in 2008 and became dependent on them. She had been using opioids again in the weeks prior to her death on January 12, 2023. However, they were found to not be a contributing factor in her death.

=== Marriages and divorces ===
==== Danny Keough ====
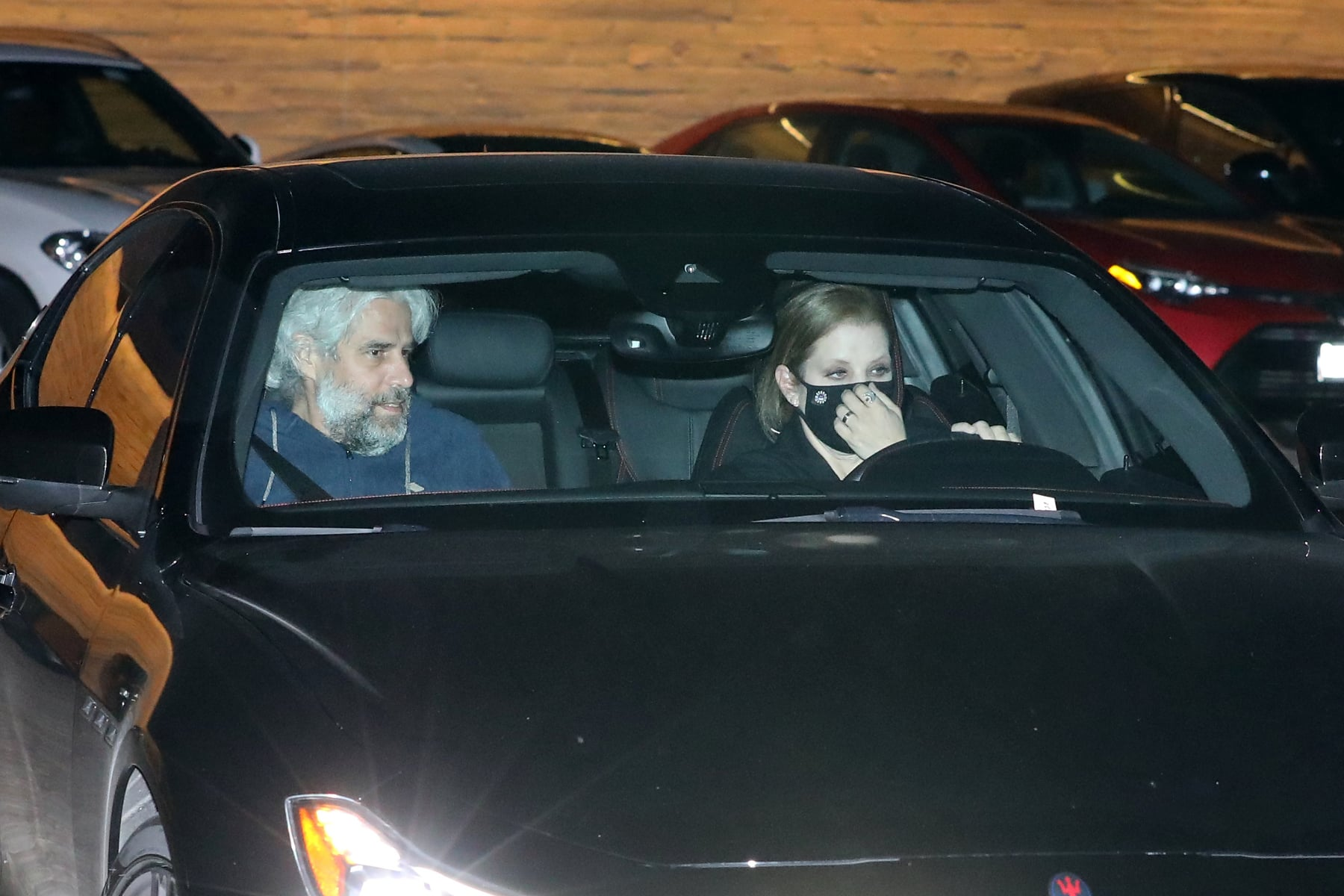
Presley with ex-husband Danny Keough in 2021

On October 3, 1988, Presley married Chicago-born musician and actor Danny Keough at the Scientology Celebrity Centre in Los Angeles. They had dated for the previous three years. Their honeymoon took place on a cruise ship owned by the Church of Scientology. After an early abortion that Presley later described as "the stupidest thing I've ever done", the couple had two children: a daughter, Riley Keough (born May 29, 1989, at Saint John's Health Center in Santa Monica, California), and a son, Benjamin Storm Keough (born October 21, 1992, at Humana Women's Hospital in Tampa, Florida, died July 12, 2020). Benjamin was delivered according to a Church of Scientology practice known as "silent birth".

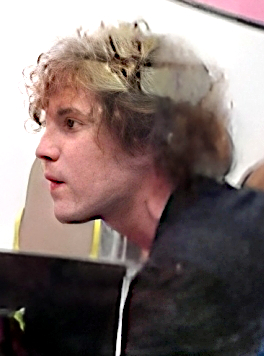
Presley's son Benjamin Keough in 2017

Presley obtained a quickie divorce in the Dominican Republic on May 6, 1994. Later that year, Keough considered seeking custody of their two children due to child-molestation charges against Michael Jackson, whom Presley married after their divorce.

In a 2003 interview with The Commercial Appeal, Presley addressed reports that she and Keough were planning to remarry: "Danny is my best friend, always has been, always will be. I love him unconditionally, but we are not together. It's not like that." Presley and Keough became closer again after her divorce from Jackson. In 2005, Keough played bass guitar in Presley's band and also served as her musical mentor. Presley continued to regard him as a close friend, and he lived in the guest house on her property. Reflecting on their relationship after their separation, Presley said, "I don't know how, but we've managed to stay close. There's others that I have pain or betrayal associated with that I won't have anything to do with. But he and I had a special thing. Unconditional." She told People in 2005 that she and Keough were like brother and sister. Presley also commented, "Ultimately this is a good message to send out to people: You don't have to put your crap on your kids even if you are not together. You can still be civilized." Presley and Keough remained close friends until her death in 2023 at age 54.

Presley's daughter, Riley, married Ben Smith-Petersen in 2015. Their daughter, Presley's grandchild, was born in 2022 by surrogacy. In 2025, Riley's grandmother Priscilla confirmed that Riley and Smith‑Petersen had welcomed a second child by surrogacy.

Benjamin died on July 12, 2020, at age 27, in Calabasas, California. The Los Angeles County medical examiner determined the cause of death to be a self‑inflicted gunshot wound and classified it as a suicide. Presley was devastated by her son's death and struggled profoundly in the years that followed. Often saying she was left without the will to live.

==== Michael Jackson ====
On May 26, 1994, 20 days after her divorce from Keough, Presley married singer Michael Jackson. Keough's younger brother served as an official witness at the wedding. Presley and Jackson had first met in 1974, when a six-year-old Presley attended one of his concerts at the Sahara Tahoe. The Jackson 5 had also notably attended her father's May 26, 1974, Tahoe Sahara show. According to a friend of Presley's, "their adult friendship began in November 1992 in L.A." Addressing the allegations of sexual abuse against Jackson, Presley later said, "I believed he didn't do anything wrong, and that he was wrongly accused and, yes, I started falling for him. I wanted to save him. I felt that I could do it." Shortly afterwards, she persuaded Jackson to settle the allegations out of court and enter rehabilitation. Presley appeared in Jackson's "You Are Not Alone" music video in June 1995, directed by Wayne Isham.

In January 1996, citing irreconcilable differences, Presley filed for divorce. Jackson's make-up artist, Karen Faye, later claimed that Jackson had initially planned to file first but relented after Presley asked him not to; the following day, he learned that she had filed herself. In a 2010 interview with Oprah Winfrey, Presley stated that the couple spent four years after the divorce "getting back together and breaking up". After Jackson's death in 2009 at age 50, Presley attended Jackson's funeral service, which was held at Glendale Forest Lawn Memorial Park on September 3, 2009. She told Winfrey in the same interview that she was the last person standing over Jackson's casket.

In a 2014 interview with The Sydney Morning Herald, Presley said, "With MJ [Michael Jackson], unfortunately, too much happened, too much got between us. There was a very deep strong love there; intense. But people got in the way, on my end and his end. We had so many people telling us what to do and intercepting and speaking on behalf of the other. Had it been just he and I, towards the end, I don't think we would have divorced." In her 2024 memoir, From Here to the Great Unknown, Presley wrote, "I've never been that happy again", referring to her time with Jackson.

==== John Oszajca ====
In May 1999, Presley met musician John Oszajca and became engaged to him two days before Christmas. She ended the engagement in March 2001, about five months after meeting Nicolas Cage at a party.

==== Nicolas Cage ====
Presley's third marriage was to Nicolas Cage, whom she had met while still in a relationship with Oszajca. They married in Kamuela, Hawaii, on August 10, 2002. Cage filed for divorce 107 days later, on November 25, and the divorce was finalized on May 24, 2004.

==== Michael Lockwood ====
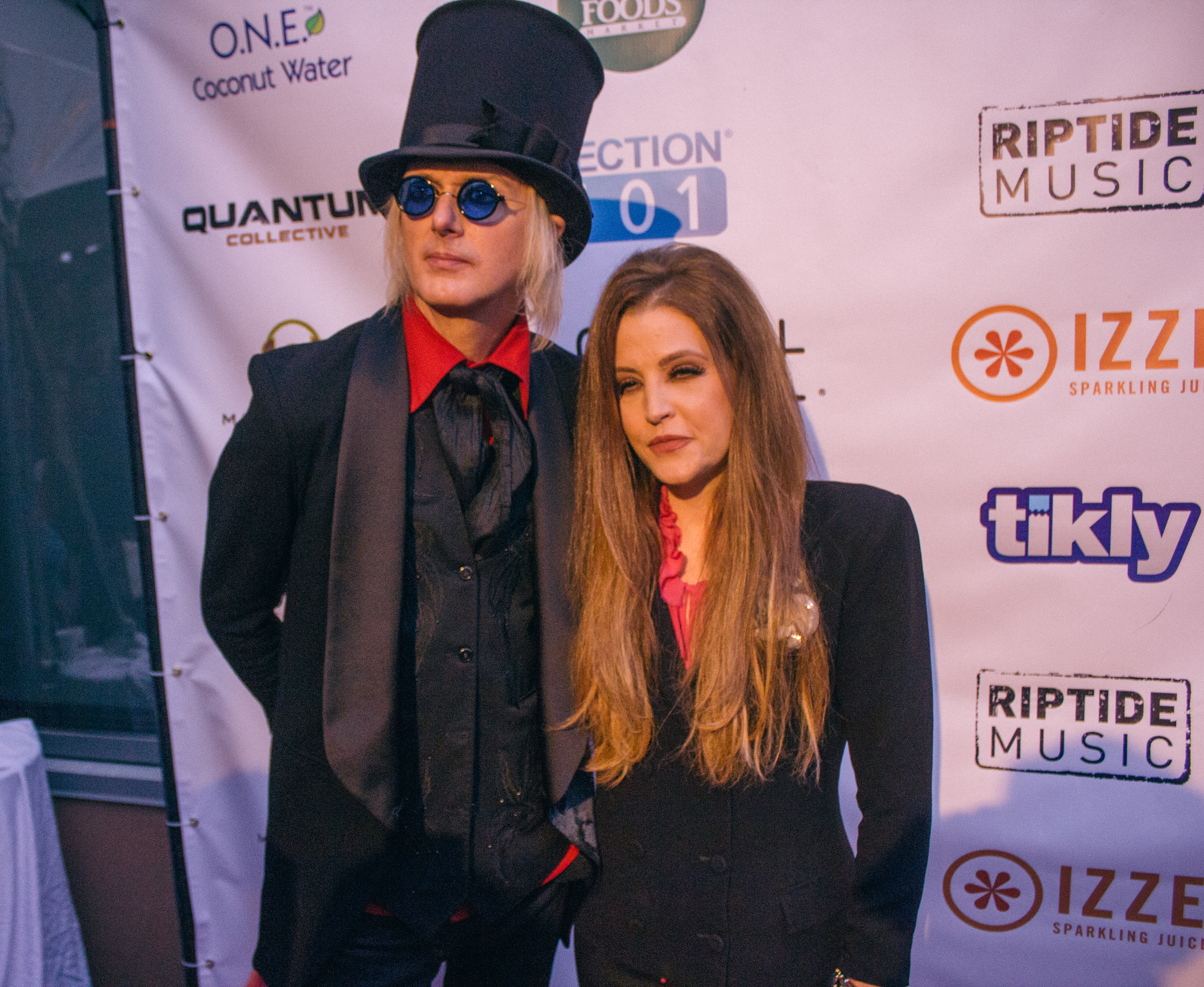
Presley with her fourth husband Michael Lockwood in 2014

On January 22, 2006, in Kyoto, Japan, Presley married for the fourth time, to Michael Lockwood, her guitarist, music producer, and musical director. Keough served as best man at the ceremony. In March 2008, Presley announced that she was pregnant and Lockwood became a first-time father. On October 7, 2008, Presley gave birth via Caesarean section to fraternal twin daughters Harper Vivienne Ann Lockwood and Finley Aaron Love Lockwood, at Los Robles Hospital & Medical Center in Thousand Oaks, California. The couple maintained a home in England at Coes Manor in Rotherfield, East Sussex, where Presley enjoyed living outside the public spotlight.

In 2016, Presley filed for divorce from Lockwood after ten years of marriage. In February 2017, the couple's children were placed in the temporary care of Priscilla after Lisa Marie alleged in a court filing that she had discovered inappropriate images of children on Lockwood's personal computer while contesting his request for spousal support. The Beverly Hills Police Department investigated the allegations, examining more than 80 electronic devices, and found no criminal activity, referring the matter to authorities in Tennessee. Later in 2017, the Tennessee Bureau of Investigations closed its inquiry, citing no evidence of a crime. The divorce was finalized on May 26, 2021.

=== Scientology ===
In 1997, Presley, along with friend and fellow Memphian and Scientologist Isaac Hayes, started the Church of Scientology Mission of Memphis and its associated Literacy, Education and Ability Program (LEAP). LEAP is operated by Applied Scholastics, an organization run by Scientologists.

For her efforts to help U.S. children develop study skills, Presley received the Humanitarian Award from the Church of Scientology-supported World Literacy Crusade on January 5, 2002. She received the award from Hayes, Chaka Khan, and Yolanda King, daughter of Martin Luther King Jr. World Literacy Crusade is regarded by critics as a front group for the Church of Scientology.

On September 26 of that same year, Presley addressed a U.S. congressional hearing in opposition to the use of medication in treating ADHD, stating: "I have spoken to children who have been forced to take a cocaine-like stimulant to control their behavior. I have shared their sense of sheer desperation. Children have been wrenched from their family's care simply because their parents favored an alternative, drug-free approach to addressing educational and behavioral problems. The psychotropic drugging of millions of children has to stop." Addressing the committee as the International Spokesperson for Children's Rights for the Citizens Commission on Human Rights (CCHR), an organization run by Scientologists, Presley argued that parents should be informed about alternatives to medication so they may "make an informed choice about their child's educational and medical needs".

Presley left Scientology in 2014, though she had been experiencing growing discontent with the organization as early as 2008. In a 2015 interview with Tony Ortega, she referred to Church of Scientology leader David Miscavige as "a good friend of mine. Now he’s fucking Hitler.” She told Ortega that learning about "The Hole" from the 2015 documentary Going Clear cemented her doubts about the Church, and that she was declared a "suppressive person" after a confrontation at the Flag Building in Clearwater over the Church's treatment of David Miscavige's father, Ron Miscavige, who she described as a close friend. She further alleged that pressure from Miscavige and Scientologist attorney John Coale were the primary reason for her divorce from Jackson, and that she had been followed by private investigators working for the Church after leaving.

== Death ==
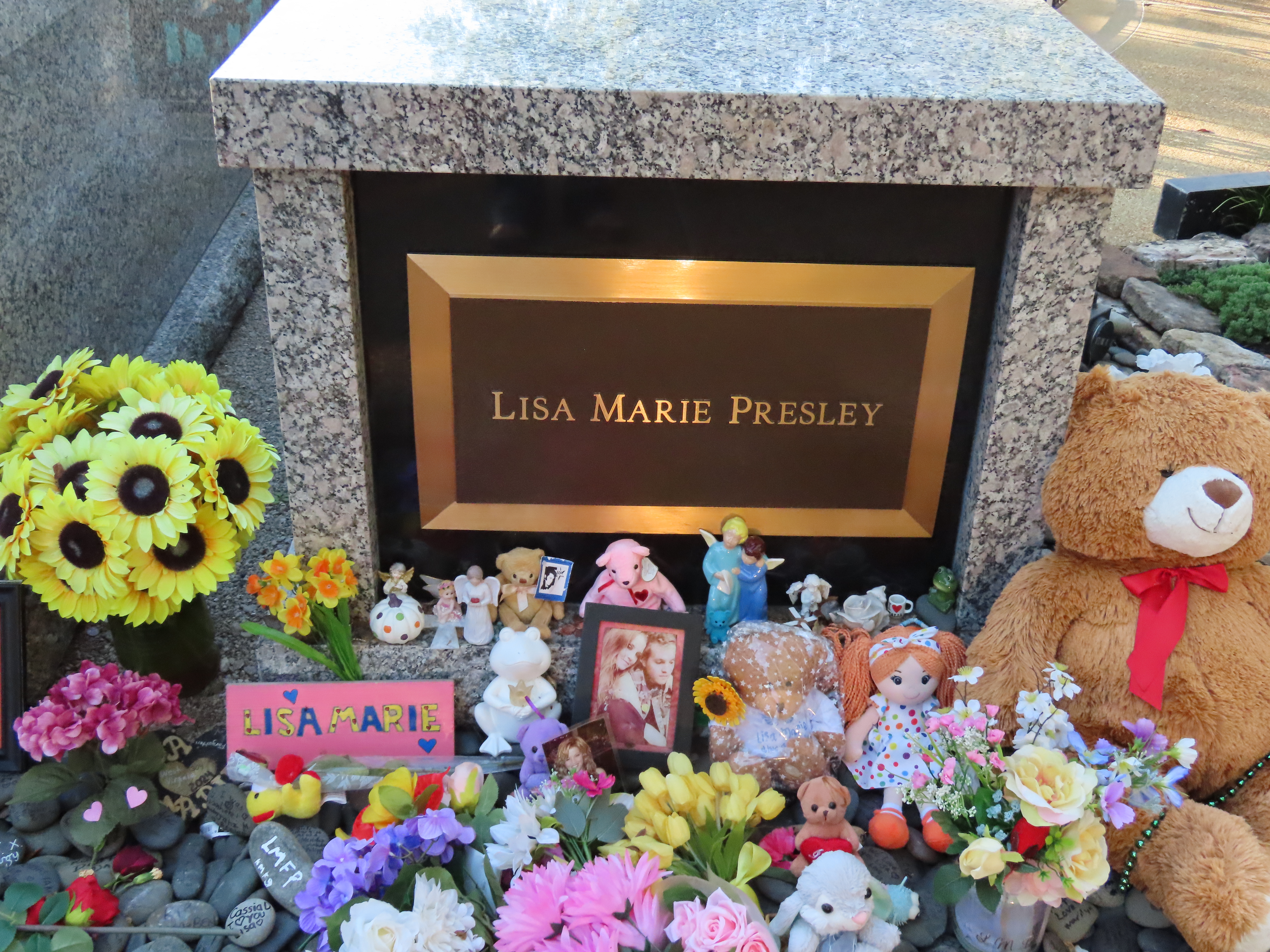
Presley's grave in the Graceland Meditation Garden

On January 12, 2023, at approximately 10:30 a.m., Presley suffered cardiac arrest at her home in Calabasas, California. Emergency responders administered CPR, and she regained a pulse before being transported to West Hills Hospital in Los Angeles. She died later that day, at age 54. According to the autopsy report, Presley died from a small bowel obstruction caused by complications of an earlier bariatric surgery. A toxicology analysis found opioids in her system, but they were not considered a factor in her death.

Presley's last public appearance had been two days earlier at the 80th Golden Globe Awards; she attended with her mother, as the biographical drama Elvis was nominated for three awards. Hundreds attended Presley's public memorial service at Graceland on January 22, and more than 1.5 million people watched the service via live stream. Presley was interred in the Graceland Meditation Garden, next to her son Benjamin and adjacent to her father, Elvis.

Those in attendance, some of whom provided spoken or musical tributes, included her mother; her surviving children; family friend Jerry Schilling; former Memphis mayor A. C. Wharton; Guns N' Roses lead singer Axl Rose; the Smashing Pumpkins lead singer Billy Corgan; Sarah, Duchess of York; gospel quartet the Blackwood Brothers; singer Alanis Morissette; and the director (Baz Luhrmann) of and star (Austin Butler) of Elvis.

On the CBS primetime special The Presleys: Elvis, Lisa Marie and Riley, which aired on October 8, 2024, Presley's daughter Riley told Oprah Winfrey that Presley's final years had been marked by profound grief, with the loss of her son Benjamin leaving her without the will to keep living.

== Elvis Presley estate ==
After Elvis's death at Graceland on August 16, 1977, his will appointed his father, Vernon, as executor and trustee. The beneficiaries of the trust were Vernon, Elvis's grandmother Minnie Mae, and Lisa Marie, whose inheritance was to be held in trust until her 25th birthday. After Vernon's death in 1979, Elvis's former wife Priscilla was named as one of three trustees; the others were the National Bank of Commerce in Memphis and Joseph Hanks, the Presleys' accountant. With Minnie Mae's death in 1980, Lisa Marie became the sole surviving beneficiary.

In 1993, Presley inherited her father's estate on her 25th birthday, which—thanks largely to her mother's stewardship—had grown to an estimated $100 million.

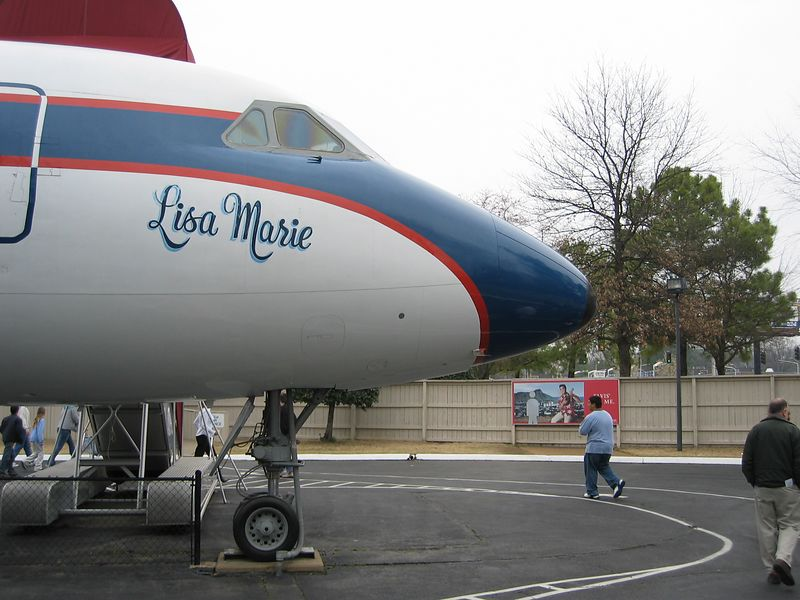
Elvis named his private Convair 880 jetliner after his daughter.

In 1998, Presley became more closely involved in the management of the Elvis Presley Trust and its business entity, Elvis Presley Enterprises, Inc. Until February 2005, she served as owner and chairman of the board, at which point she sold 85 percent of the estate's business holdings to CKX, Inc., excluding Graceland itself and the property within it.

Following Presley's death, her three daughters were expected to inherit Graceland. However, her mother Priscilla challenged a 2016 amendment Presley had made to her estate, which removed Priscilla as trustee and named her two oldest children. One of them, Presley's son Benjamin, died by suicide in 2020, leaving Riley as sole trustee.

On August 16, 2024, Missouri woman Lisa Jeanine Findley was arrested for a scheme that involved, among other things, using a fraudulent claim about Presley owing money in an attempt to illegally force the sale of Graceland. According to the U.S. Department of Justice's Office of Public Affairs, Findley "allegedly fabricated loan documents" on which she "forged the signatures of Elvis Presley's daughter and a Florida State notary public. Findley then allegedly filed a false creditor's claim with the Superior Court of California in Los Angeles, and a fake deed of trust with the Shelby County Register's Office in Memphis" and "allegedly published a fraudulent foreclosure notice."

One person involved with the scheme told The New York Times in May 2024 that the plot was connected to a ring of identity thieves based in Florida who claimed Presley owed $2.8 million to Naussany Investments & Private Lending LLC. However, Naussany Investments & Private Lending LLC was not a real company, and the identity thieves routinely used forgeries of recently deceased individuals to carry out fraud schemes. As a central figure in facilitating the attempted sale of Graceland, Findley "posed as three different individuals" associated with the "fictitious private lender" to falsely claim that Presley had borrowed $3.8 million from Naussany Investments in 2018. The loan documents purportedly signed by Presley had allegedly been acknowledged before Kimberly L. Philbrick, a Florida notary public. Philbrick supported Riley in her lawsuit against Naussany, stating in an affidavit, "I have never met Lisa Marie Presley, nor have I ever notarized a document signed by Lisa Marie Presley. ... I do not know why my signature appears on this document."

=== "Elvis Through His Daughter's Eyes" exhibit ===
In February 2012, Presley opened a new exhibit, "Elvis ... Through His Daughter's Eyes". It is included in the Graceland VIP Tour and features 200 items assembled by Presley and the Graceland Archives staff.

The personal exhibit explores Presley's experience of growing up with a famous father. Home movies, toys, and rarely seen family mementos are among the items on display.

=== Aircraft Lisa Marie ===
In November 1975, her father named one of his private aircraft, a converted Convair 880 jet, after her. He spent more than $1 million refurbishing it for use as his main transport while on tour. The Lisa Marie and one of his other planes, Hound Dog II, are on exhibit at Graceland.

== Awards and honors ==
On June 24, 2011, Presley was officially honored by the governor of Tennessee, Bill Haslam, who proclaimed a day of recognition for her charitable efforts. Two days later, she received a Certificate of Proclamation from the mayor of New Orleans, Mitchell J. Landrieu, in recognition of her dedication and contributions to the city. She was also issued a proclamation by the city of Memphis on June 28, 2011, for her philanthropy there.

Award	Year	Nominee(s)	Category	Result	Ref.
Groovevolt Music and Fashion Awards	2004	To Whom It May Concern	Best Rock Album - Female	Nominated	
Teen Choice Awards	2003	Herself	Choice Breakout Music Artist	Nominated	

== Discography ==
=== Studio albums ===
List of studio albums, with selected details, chart positions and certifications
Title	Details	Peak chart positions					Certifications (sales threshold)
Title	Details	US	AUS	GER	SWI	UK	Certifications (sales threshold)
To Whom It May Concern	Release date: April 8, 2003; Label: Capitol Records; Formats: CD, music download	5	54	74	86	52	RIAA: Gold
Now What	Release date: April 5, 2005; Label: Capitol Records; Formats: CD, music download	9	—	—	76	—	
Storm & Grace	Release date: May 15, 2012; Label: Universal Republic; Formats: CD, vinyl, music download	45	—	—	—	—	

=== Singles ===
List of singles, with selected chart positions, showing year released and album name
Title	Year	Peak chart positions						Album
Title	Year	US AC	US Adult	US Pop	AUS	NZ	UK	Album
"Lights Out"	2003	—	18	34	29	28	16	To Whom It May Concern
"Sinking In"	2003	—	—	—	—	—	—	To Whom It May Concern
"Dirty Laundry"	2005	36	—	—	—	—	—	Now What
"Idiot"	2005	—	—	—	—	—	—	Now What
"Thanx"	2005	—	—	—	—	—	—	Now What
"In the Ghetto" (with Elvis Presley)	2007	—	—	—	—	—	—	Non-album single
"You Ain't Seen Nothing Yet"	2012	—	—	—	—	—	—	Storm & Grace
"I Love You Because" (with Elvis Presley)	2012	—	—	—	—	—	—	Non-album single
"Over Me"	2013	—	—	—	—	—	—	Storm & Grace
"—" denotes a single that did not chart or was not released in that territory.

== Tours ==
- S.O.B. Tour (2003–2004)
- Now What Tour (2005–2006)
- Storm & Grace Tour (2012–2014)

== Portrayals ==
On screen Presley has been portrayed by:

- Krista Rae (2004) in Man in the Mirror: The Michael Jackson Story (VH1 biopic)
