= Storm & Grace =

Studio album by Lisa Marie Presley
- Released: May 15, 2012
- Recorded: 2010–2012
- Studios: London, England; The Village (Los Angeles, California)
- Genres: Country; folk; blues; roots rock
- Length: 44:27 (Standard); 58:21 (Deluxe)
- Labels: Universal Republic; XIX Recordings
- Producer: T Bone Burnett

Lisa Marie Presley chronology
Now What (2005)	Storm & Grace (2012)

Singles from Storm & Grace
- 1. "You Ain't Seen Nothin' Yet" Released: April 17, 2012; 2. "Over Me" Released: July 15, 2013

Alternative cover

Professional ratings
Review scores
Source	Rating
AllMusic	3.5/5 stars
Rolling Stone	2.5/3 stars

Storm & Grace is the third and final studio album by American singer-songwriter Lisa Marie Presley. It was released on May 15, 2012, in the United States and Canada and was the singer's first album in seven years following the 2005 release Now What. Storm & Grace was her only album released via Universal Republic after having left her previous label, Capitol. The album was preceded by the lead single "You Ain't Seen Nothin' Yet". The album was produced by T Bone Burnett.

== Production ==
Presley began work on the album in 2010. She confirmed during an interview with Oprah Winfrey on "Oprah" that she was in London recording a new album which, at the time, was due for release in 2011.

"Just over two years ago, I went to England to attempt to write another record after finding myself in a considerably disheartened and uninspired state creatively. Over an 8-month period, I wrote 30 songs. I was fortunate to be able to write with some incredible artists and singers such as Richard Hawley (from Pulp), Ed Harcourt, Sacha Skarbek and Fran Healy (from Travis), to name a few," said Presley. "Nothing was planned or contrived in any way, and out of it came a very organic record that was always inside of me and that I am incredibly proud of. It was a dream come true and such an honor when T Bone liked the songs and produced and played on the record."

"I went through a period where I was so upset at how obscured I had been from all of that. I intentionally sought out everything bad that was written about me. If you’re looking for it, you’re going to get it."

— Presley on her feeling of being shielded from the things people would say about her.

"When songs from Lisa Marie Presley showed up at my door, I was curious. I wondered what the daughter of an American revolutionary music artist had to say. What I heard was honest, raw, unaffected and soulful. I thought her father would be proud of her. The more I listened to the songs, the deeper an artist I found her to be. Listening beyond the media static, Lisa Marie Presley is a Southern American folk music artist of great value," said Burnett.

Presley performed on American Idol on May 17, 2012, to promote the album.

== Promotion ==
To promote both Storm & Grace and the single "You Ain't Seen Nothin' Yet", Presley and her label announced promotional stops throughout the release week of May 14 to 18. On May 15, Presley appeared on the morning news program Good Morning America, American Idol on May 17, The Tonight Show with Jay Leno on May 21 and Jimmy Kimmel Live! on May 22. Presley also celebrated the album's release by signing copies of the disc at Sun Studios in Memphis, Tennessee on Monday, May 14, 2012, while on May 17 American Express sponsored and presented "An Evening with Lisa Marie Presley" at the Grammy Museum's Clive Davis Theater.

"At first I was really scared of it, which is why I was constantly fighting and having such an attitude about it. I was really defensive because I would fight, not who I am or him, but just what was going to happen. I was defensive. But once I got that out of my system – trying to fight to be that whole thing – what came out of my heart just came out. And I embrace it wholeheartedly now because you have to sort of just go through things and grow, and, throughout that process, I think that was what ended up happening."

— Presley on her feelings about being compared to her father, Elvis.

== Critical reception ==
Spinner.com observed: "Presley has made the strongest album of her career in the upcoming Storm & Grace. It's a moody masterpiece, exploring the demons and angels of her life to the tune of country-spiced downbeat pop."

Rolling Stone complimented the album by saying, "Storm & Grace is the album she was born to make – a raw, powerful country, folk and blues collection that finds her embracing her Southern roots and family name", while Entertainment Weekly praised its "smoky, spooky single 'You Ain't Seen Nothing Yet'."

"On her first two albums, Lisa Marie Presley wanted to be a pop star with a difference; on Storm & Grace, she clearly would rather be an artist, and if she's still working her musical shortcomings out of her system, this is a stronger, more mature, and more effective work than one might have expected. Nearly ten years into a recording career she may or may not have wanted, Presley is finally developing a musical personality that truly suits her," Allmusic said, complimenting of Presley's work on the album.

== Commercial performance ==
Storm & Grace debuted at number 45 on the US Billboard 200, including number 21 on the Top Rock Albums chart selling over 9,000 copies in its first week.

== Track listing ==
All lyrics are written by Lisa Marie Presley. All tracks produced by T Bone Burnett.

Storm & Grace track listing
No.	Title	Music	Length
1.	"Over Me"	Ed Harcourt; Jimmy Hogarth	3:54
2.	"You Ain't Seen Nothin' Yet"	James Bryan McCollum; Sacha Skarbek	3:46
3.	"Weary"	Richard Hawley	2:49
4.	"Close to the Edge"	McCollum; Skarbek	5:16
5.	"So Long"	Luke Potashnick; Skarbek	3:40
6.	"Un-Break"	Potashnick; Skarbek	4:06
7.	"Soften the Blows"	Harcourt; Hogarth	4:30
8.	"Storm of Nails"	Harcourt	4:27
9.	"How Do You Fly This Plane?"	Hawley	4:03
10.	"Forgiving"	Steve Booker	3:38
11.	"Storm & Grace"	Hawley	4:18
Total length:			44:27

Deluxe edition
No.	Title	Music	Length
12.	"Heartless"	Fran Healy	3:50
13.	"Sticks and Stones"	Potashnick; Skarbek	4:10
14.	"I Was Wrong"	Hawley	2:49
15.	"Just a Dream"	Hawley	3:05
Total length:			58:21

== Personnel ==
Credits for Storm & Grace adapted from AllMusic.

- Paul Ackling – guitar technician
- Frank Arigo – product manager
- Jay Bellerose – drums
- Sandy Brummels – art direction
- T Bone Burnett – guitar, producer
- Mike Compton – mandolin
- Dennis Crouch – bass
- Zach Dawes – bass
- Kyle Ford – second engineer
- Keefus Green – keyboards
- Ed Harcourt – backing vocals
- Lorna Leighton – art direction, design
- Greg Leisz – pedal steel
- Michael Lockwood – guitar
- Greg Lotus – photography
- Gavin Lurssen – mastering
- Blake Mills – guitar
- Vanessa Parr – engineer, second engineer
- Lisa Marie Presley – lead and backing vocals
- Ivy Skoff – production coordination
- Jackson Smith – guitar
- Patrick Warren – keyboards
- Jason Wormer – engineer, mixing

== Charts ==
Chart performance for Storm & Grace
Chart (2012)	Peak position
Canadian Albums (Nielsen SoundScan)	80
US Billboard 200	45
US Top Rock Albums (Billboard)	21

== Release history ==
Release history and formats for Storm & Grace
Region	Date	Format	Edition(s)	Label
United States	May 15, 2012	CD; digital download	Standard; deluxe	Universal Republic; XIX Recordings
