= Now What (Lisa Marie Presley album) =

Studio album by Lisa Marie Presley
- Released: April 5, 2005
- Genres: Rock, pop rock
- Length: 51:03 (US version); 55:17 (Japanese version)
- Label: Capitol
- Producers: Eric Rosse; Lisa Marie Presley (exec.); Michael Lockwood (exec.)

Lisa Marie Presley chronology
To Whom It May Concern (2003)	Now What (2005)	Storm & Grace (2012)

Singles from Now What
- 1. "Dirty Laundry" Released: February 14, 2005; 2. "Idiot" Released: July 19, 2005; 3. "Thanx" Released: July 25, 2005

Now What is the second studio album from American singer-songwriter Lisa Marie Presley. Released on April 5, 2005, in the United States and Canada, it was Presley's last album released under Capitol Records. Two singles were released from the album, a cover of Don Henley's "Dirty Laundry" and "Idiot".

In the US, an exclusive version of the album sold at Walmart contained a card with a code to download an acoustic version of the song "Thanx".

== Reception ==
=== Critical ===
Professional ratings
Review scores
Source	Rating
AllMusic	4/5 stars
Entertainment Weekly	B−
Now	2/5
Rolling Stone	2.5/5 stars
Slant	2.5/5 stars

Upon its release, the album received generally mixed reviews from music critics. On review aggregate site Metacritic, the album holds a score of 60 out of 100.

In a review for Entertainment Weekly, critic Jenny Williams praised Presley's cover of "Dirty Laundry" as "sultry" and fitting for her "fiery persona", but argued that Presley's vocal style "can't win the battle against the disc's glossy production". Critic Elizabeth Bromstein, writing for Toronto newspaper Now, deemed the album "well constructed and melodic but ultimately lacklustre and heavy on the downtempo emotional", singling out covers "Dirty Laundry" and "Here Today, Gone Tomorrow" as highlights. AllMusic critic Stephen Thomas Erlewine wrote that the album was better than her debut and had stronger hooks, deeming it an "Album Pick" from Presley's discography and identifying "I'll Figure It Out", "Thanx", and "Shine" as highlights.

=== Commercial ===
On the Billboard 200 chart dated April 13, 2005, Now What debuted at number nine, with first-week sales of 56,000 copies. It was the second-highest debut of the week, behind only Faith Evans' The First Lady, which opened at number two.

=== Legacy ===
In a January 2023 article for the New York Post, following Presley's death, music journalist Chuck Arnold praised Presley's decision to cover Henley's "Dirty Laundry" rather than an Elvis song. Arnold argued that although an Elvis cover would have been more commercially successful, "You have to give Presley credit... for not riding her dad’s coattails", also praising "Dirty Laundry" as "a perfect song for Presley" to cover.

== Track listing ==
All lyrics written by Lisa Marie Presley except: "Dirty Laundry", written by Don Henley and Danny Kortchmar; and "Here Today, Gone Tomorrow", written by Joey Ramone. All music composition authors listed below.

1. "I'll Figure It Out" (Linda Perry, Presley) – 3:28
2. "Turbulence" (Michael Lockwood, Presley) – 3:56
3. "Thanx" (Perry, Presley) – 4:26
4. "Shine" featuring Pink (Perry, Presley) – 4:10
5. "Dirty Laundry" (Don Henley, Danny Kortchmar) – 4:28
6. "When You Go" (Anthony Penaloza, Presley) – 4:11
7. "Idiot" (Perry, Presley) – 4:09
8. "High Enough" (Perry, Presley) – 4:36
9. "Turned to Black" (Lockwood, Presley, Rosse) – 5:27
10. "Raven" (Perry, Presley) – 5:03
11. "Now What" (Perry, Presley) – 3:54

+ "Here Today, Gone Tomorrow" (Jeffrey Hyman) – 2:57 (hidden track)
Originally planned to be recorded for The Ramones tribute album We're a Happy Family (2003); Sex Pistols guitarist Steve Jones plays lead guitar.

"Yellow to Blue" (Perry, Presley) – 4:12 (Japanese bonus track)

"Thanx" (acoustic)
Offered as a bonus download redeemable with a special code that only came with versions of the album sold at Wal-Mart.

== Singles ==
- "Dirty Laundry"
- "Idiot"

=== B-sides ===
- "Burnin' for You"

== Charts ==
Chart performance for Now What
Chart (2005)	Peak position
Canadian Albums (Nielsen SoundScan)	13
Swiss Albums (Schweizer Hitparade)	76
US Billboard 200	9
