= Gus Black =

American singer

- Also known as: Gus
- Origin: Los Angeles, United States
- Genre: Rock
- Years active: 1996–present

Anthony Penaloza, better known by his stage name Gus Black and formerly known by the mononym Gus, is an American director, singer-songwriter, and producer.

He signed to Almo Sounds and released two albums on the label, 1996's Gus and 1999's Word of Mouth Parade. The label disbanded in 2000. Since then, Black has released three albums, all of which were released internationally before seeing domestic distribution.

His album "Autumn Days" was listed by iTunes as a Top 10 Indie Singer/Songwriter release of 2006. The 2008 release "Today Is Not The Day..." received positive reviews from European critics.

He produced a cover of the Blue Öyster Cult song "(Don't Fear) The Reaper" for the Scream soundtrack. The same cover was featured at the end of the 19th episode of season 2 of Smallville and in the horror film The Howling: Reborn. His cover of Black Sabbath's "Paranoid" appeared on the "Absinthe Makes the Heart Grow Fonder" episode of the TV show Californication. His work has been featured in several other TV shows as well, including Alias, Brothers and Sisters, One Tree Hill, and Grey's Anatomy.

In 2003, Lisa Marie Presley released her debut album To Whom It May Concern which featured a track co-written by Gus called "The Road Between". Similarly, in 2005, Lisa Marie released her second album Now What which featured "When You Go," also co-written by Gus. Both albums were released via Capitol Records.

Gus works as a commercial and video director. In addition to directing videos for his own songs, he directed the documentary "Tremendous Dynamite: The Making of Hombre Lobo" for Eels as well as several music video clips for the band. He has also directed videos for Phoebe Bridgers, Lizzy McAlpine, Greta Van Fleet, Eels, Needtobreathe, The War and Treaty, Warren Zeiders, JVKE, Laufey, & Sombr.

In 2011 he completed work on his 6th full-length recording entitled "The Day I Realized...".

== Discography ==
- Gus (Almo Sounds, 1996)
- Word of Mouth Parade (Almo Sounds, 1999)
- Uncivilized Love (Wild Abandon Records UK, 2002/Immergent Records US, 2003)
- Autumn Days (Olinda/India Records, Europe, 2005/Cheap Lullaby Records, US, 2006)
- Today Is Not the Day to Fuck with... (Cheap Lullaby, 2008)
- The Day I Realized... (India Records 2011)
- "Split The Moon (Live at Lido)" (India Records 2012)
