= To Whom It May Concern (Lisa Marie Presley album) =

Studio album by Lisa Marie Presley
- Released: April 8, 2003
- Genres: Rock; pop rock
- Length: 50:45
- Label: Capitol
- Producers: Eric Rosse; Andrew Slater

Lisa Marie Presley chronology
To Whom It May Concern (2003)	Now What (2005)

Singles from To Whom It May Concern
- 1. "Lights Out" Released: February 10, 2003; 2. "Sinking In" Released: June 30, 2003

To Whom It May Concern is the debut studio album by American singer-songwriter Lisa Marie Presley. It was released on April 8, 2003, in the United States and Canada.

Two singles were released from the album: "Lights Out" and "Sinking In". The video for "Lights Out" reached No. 15 on the CMT Top 20 Countdown.

A song Presley wrote about her ex-husband Michael Jackson, "Disciple", was cut from the album prior to its release.

== Critical reception ==
Professional ratings
Review scores
Source	Rating
AllMusic	4/5 stars
Rolling Stone	3/5 stars
The Village Voice	C

The album received positive reviews from critics who complimented Presley's vocals and her songwriting.

Los Angeles Times critic Robert Hilburn reviewed Presley's debut album and said, "The music on her new album, has a stark, uncompromising tone", and later said, "Presley's gutsy blues-edged voice has a distinctive flair."

AllMusic critic Stephen Thomas Erlewine said: "This is a sharp, ambitious mainstream pop/rock album performed by a singer with real character – thankfully, one that's surly, not sweet, since there's been too much sweetness from divas in the 2000s", giving the album four out of five stars.

== Commercial performance ==
The album sold 142,000 copies during its first week of release, and debuted at No. 5 on the Billboard 200 album chart. In May 2003, the Recording Industry Association of America certified the album gold.

== Track listing ==
All lyrics are written by Lisa Marie Presley, except "The Road Between" co-written by Gus Black.

To Whom It May Concern track listing
No.	Title	Music	Length
1.	"S.O.B."	Glen Ballard, Clif Magness, Presley	3:45
2.	"The Road Between"	Gus Black, Presley, Greg Wells	4:18
3.	"Lights Out"	Ballard, Magness, Presley	3:45
4.	"Better Beware"	Danny Keough, Presley, Eric Rosse	4:45
5.	"Nobody Noticed It"	Magness, Presley	4:34
6.	"Sinking In"	Ballard, Keough, Magness, Presley	4:31
7.	"Important"	Magness, Presley	3:51
8.	"So Lovely"	Ballard, John Barry, Presley	4:56
9.	"Indifferent"	Presley, Rosse	3:59
10.	"Gone"	Presley, Diego Sandrin	4:07
11.	"To Whom It May Concern"	Ballard, Presley	4:38

North America bonus tracks
No.	Title	Music	Length
12.	"Excuse Me" (hidden track (appended to the end of "To Whom It May Concern"))	Ballard, Presley	3:16

Japan bonus tracks
No.	Title	Music	Length
12.	"Excuse Me"	Ballard, Presley	3:16
13.	"Savior" (hidden track (appended to the end of "Excuse Me"))	Billy Corgan, Magness, Presley	3:20

== Personnel ==
=== Musicians ===
- Lisa Marie Presley – lead and background vocals
- Eric Rosse – organ, synthesizer, piano, Hammond organ, programming, sound effects, Fender Rhodes, string arrangements
- David Campbell – string arrangements (tracks 3, 5, 6, 7, 11 and 12)
- Rusty Anderson, Doyle Bramhall II, Jon Brion, Steve Caton – guitars
- Paul Bushnell – bass
- Lenny Castro – percussion
- Matt Chamberlain – acoustic and electronic percussion
- Mike Elizondo – bass
- Abe Laboriel Jr. – drums, percussion, guitars
- Wendy Melvoin – guitars
- Zac Rae – Chamberlin
- Patrick Warren – piano
- Bruce Watson – guitars, mandolin
- Lyle Workman – guitars

=== Production ===
- Eric Rosse – producer, engineer, editing
- Andrew Slater – producer, executive producer
- Steve Genewick – assistant engineer
- Mike Glines – assistant engineer
- Fernio Hernandez – mix assistant
- Jimmy Hoyson – assistant engineer
- Tom Lord-Alge – mixing
- Charles Paakkari – assistant engineer
- Robert Read – mixing assistant
- Ronnie Rivera – engineer
- Jim Scott – mixing
- Howard Willing – engineer, editing
- Chris Wonzer – assistant engineer

== Charts and certifications ==
=== Weekly charts ===
Weekly chart performance for To Whom It May Concern
Chart (2003)	Peak position
Australian Albums (ARIA)	54
Canadian Albums (Nielsen SoundScan)	12
German Albums (Offizielle Top 100)	74
Scottish Albums (Official Charts)	48
Swiss Albums (Schweizer Hitparade)	86
UK Albums (Official Charts)	52
US Billboard 200	5

=== Year-end charts ===
Year-end chart performance for To Whom It May Concern
Chart (2003)	Position
US Billboard 200	129

=== Certifications ===
Certifications for To Whom It May Concern
Region	Certification	Certified units/sales
United States (RIAA)	Gold	500,000^{^}
^{^} Shipments figures based on certification alone.
