= Riley Keough =

American actress (born 1989)

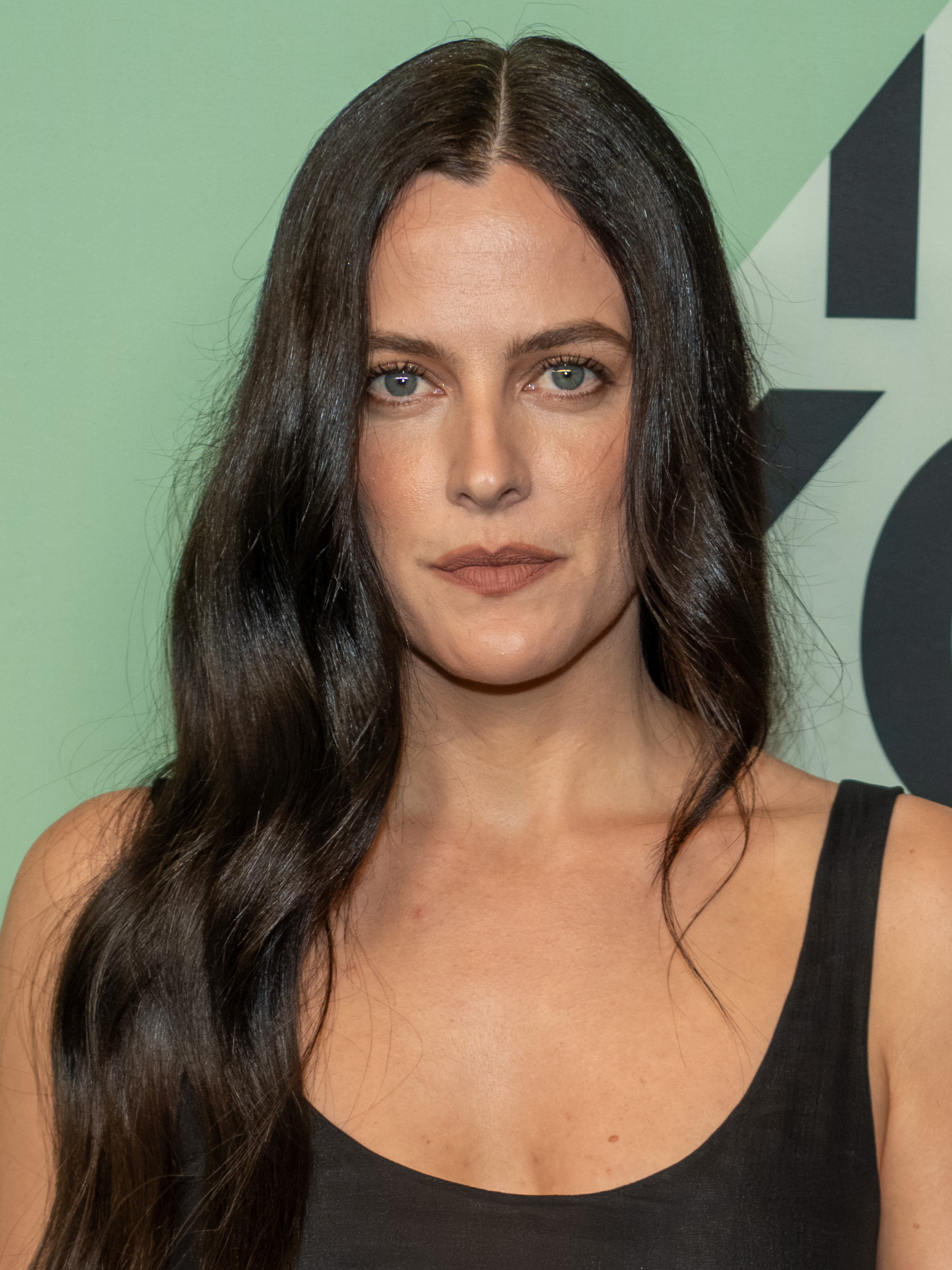
- Keough at the 2025 New York Film Festival
- Born: Danielle Riley Keough; May 29, 1989 (age 37); Santa Monica, California, U.S.
- Occupation: Actress
- Years active: 2004–present
- Spouse: Ben Smith-Petersen (m. 2015)
- Children: 2
- Parents: Lisa Marie Presley (mother); Danny Keough (father)
- Relatives: Elvis Presley (grandfather); Priscilla Presley (grandmother); Navarone Garibaldi (half-uncle)

Danielle Riley Keough (/ˈkiːoʊ/ KEE-oh; born May 29, 1989) is an American actress. Born into the Presley family, she is the eldest daughter of Lisa Marie Presley and the eldest grandchild of Elvis Presley and Priscilla Presley. She began her career as a model from 2004 to 2008 before transitioning to acting, making her feature film debut in a supporting part in the musical biopic The Runaways (2010), portraying Marie Currie.

Keough's early roles included the independent thriller The Good Doctor (2011), the comedy-drama film Magic Mike (2012), and the action epic Mad Max: Fury Road (2015). Her performance as a wayward young woman in the Andrea Arnold drama film American Honey (2016) earned her an Independent Spirit Award nomination. She has since taken roles in the horror films It Comes at Night (2017), and The House That Jack Built (2018), the black comedy thriller Under the Silver Lake (2017), the heist film Logan Lucky (2017), the dark comedy-crime drama Zola (2020), and the absurdist fantasy Sasquatch Sunset (2024), the latter of which she served as an executive producer.

On television, she has earned a Golden Globe Award nomination for her portrayal of an escort in the first season of the anthology series The Girlfriend Experience (2016). She has starred as a military wife in thriller series The Terminal List (2022) and a singer-songwriter in the drama miniseries Daisy Jones & the Six (2023) both for Amazon Prime Video. The latter earned her nominations for another Golden Globe and a Primetime Emmy Award.

Keough is a co-founder of the production company Felix Culpa. She has co-directed the drama War Pony (2022), which won the Caméra d'Or. She became the sole owner of Elvis Presley's estate Graceland, following her mother Lisa Marie Presley's death in 2023.

== Early life and education ==
Keough was born at St. Johns Hospital in Santa Monica, California. She is the eldest child of singer-songwriter Lisa Marie Presley (1968–2023) and musician Danny Keough; she is also the eldest grandchild of Elvis Presley and actress and businesswoman Priscilla Presley. Her father met her mother at the Church of Scientology Celebrity Centre and later played bass in Presley's band. She had a brother, Benjamin Storm Keough (1992–2020), and has two half-sisters from her mother's fourth marriage, to Michael Lockwood. Her maternal grandmother, Priscilla, is of part Norwegian descent. Keough's paternal grandmother, Janet Hollander, co-founded the Delphian School and served as its dean from 1995 to 2011.

When Keough was five years old, her parents divorced, and her mother was briefly married to Michael Jackson from 1994 to 1996. Of her upbringing, Keough said that she "grew up very privileged with my mother, but my dad didn't live like that. And I think experiencing both sides has been helpful. My father had mattresses on the floor of his apartments. He lived in cabins and trailer parks. He just didn't have much money... Actually, my memories of growing up with him were so colorful and eccentric and fun. It was a good vibe, you know? When I was like eight I told him, 'I want to grow up and be poor like you!' He was eating a bowl of cereal. I didn't realize how wildly offensive that was!" Keough was raised primarily by her father in Hawaii and Los Angeles, though she at times lived at her mother's Los Angeles home, as well as at the Graceland Estate in Memphis, Tennessee, which her mother inherited following her grandfather Elvis's death.

In 2002, when Keough was 13 years old, her mother married actor Nicolas Cage, though this marriage was also short-lived, lasting 107 days before Cage filed for divorce. The divorce was finalized in May 2004. For a time, Keough attended a public school in the San Fernando Valley, but was ultimately homeschooled due to her having to frequently travel between her parents' homes.

== Career ==
=== 2004–2008: Modeling ===
Prior to beginning a film career, Keough began modeling at age 15, appearing in the Autumn/Winter 2004 ready-to-wear show for Dolce & Gabbana, followed by the Christian Dior ready-to-wear show for the Spring/Summer 2005 collection. Keough subsequently appeared on the cover of Vogue in August 2004 alongside Priscilla and Lisa Marie Presley. In 2005 she appeared on the covers of Elle Japon, Vogue Korea, Jalouse, and L'Officiel.

=== 2009–2015: Film career beginnings ===
In 2010, at the age of 20, Keough made her film debut in The Runaways based on the 1970s all-girl rock band of the same name. Keough portrayed the role of Marie Currie, sister to the band's lead singer Cherie Currie, portrayed by Dakota Fanning. The film also starred Kristen Stewart and Tatum O'Neal and premiered in 2010 at the Sundance Film Festival to favorable reviews.

In April 2011, Keough starred as the female lead in the drama The Good Doctor alongside Orlando Bloom and Taraji P. Henson. Keough portrayed Diane Nixon, a young patient with a kidney infection who is kept ill to make her doctor gain the respect he craves. The film received mixed reviews from critics. In May 2010, she replaced actress Olivia Thirlby as the protagonist in the werewolf drama Jack & Diane alongside Juno Temple, who portrayed her love interest. Filming took place in New York City, and in May 2011 Magnolia Pictures picked up the film for distribution; it was released theatrically in November 2012.

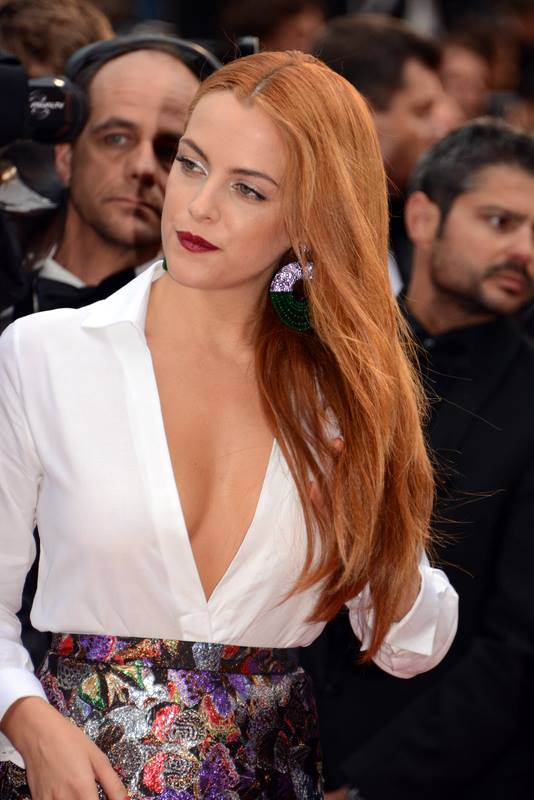
Keough at the 2014 Cannes Film Festival

In September 2011, Keough joined the Steven Soderbergh film Magic Mike, alongside Channing Tatum, Matthew McConaughey and Alex Pettyfer, about a group of male strippers. Keough portrayed the role of Nora, a young stripper. The film was released in June 2012. Keough then co-starred in the independent drama Yellow, alongside Sienna Miller, Luke Wilson and David Morse, followed by a supporting role opposite Milo Ventimiglia in the independent vampire film Kiss of the Damned, which premiered at the 2012 Venice Film Festival.

On August 4, 2013, the Australian fashion brand Bonds announced that Keough had been signed as "Summer 2013 ambassador". In October 2013, Keough co-starred in the video for Justin Timberlake's "TKO", portraying a bitter girlfriend who knocks out Timberlake and ties him to the back of a pickup truck, dragging him through the desert and throwing him off a cliff.

Keough appeared in director So Yong Kim's short film Spark and Light commissioned by fashion brand Miu Miu in 2014. The actress had a supporting role as a woman called Capable in Mad Max: Fury Road, the fourth installment of the Mad Max series. The film was released in May 2015 to critical and commercial success.

In December 2015, Dixieland was released by IFC Films, in which Keough starred as a woman living in a Mississippi trailer park who becomes embroiled in a crime. The film had previously screened at the Tribeca Film Festival in April 2015.

=== 2016–present: Breakthrough and subsequent roles ===
In January 2016, Keough's following film, the lesbian drama Lovesong, premiered at the Sundance Film Festival. Keough reunited with director So Yong Kim for the film, in which she co-starred with Jena Malone as two best friends who fall in love with each other. Keough had her breakthrough role portraying a law student-turned-escort in the first season of the anthology series The Girlfriend Experience, based on the film of the same name from director Steven Soderbergh. The 13-episode series premiered on Starz on April 10, 2016. Her performance in The Girlfriend Experience garnered rave reviews and awards buzz from critics. She went on to receive a Golden Globe nomination for Best Performance by an Actress in a Limited Series or Motion Picture Made for Television.

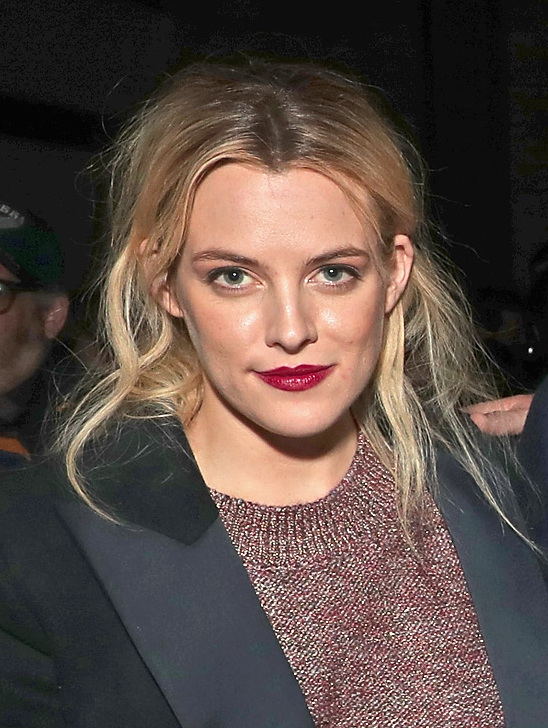
Keough in 2017

Also in 2016, Keough appeared in Andrea Arnold's drama film American Honey, alongside Shia LaBeouf. The film premiered in competition at the 2016 Cannes Film Festival, where it won the Jury Prize. Keough received praise for her role in the film, and received a nomination at the Film Independent Spirit Awards for Best Supporting Female. The same year, she appeared in The Discovery directed by Charlie McDowell. It had its world premiere at the Sundance Film Festival on January 20, 2017, and was released on March 31, 2017, by Netflix. Her next film release was the drama We Don't Belong Here (2017), filmed in 2014, in which she starred as the daughter of a dysfunctional family alongside Catherine Keener and Anton Yelchin. Keough's subsequent film was It Comes at Night, an apocalyptic-themed horror film, in which she starred opposite Joel Edgerton and Christopher Abbott, and directed by Trey Edward Shults. The film was released theatrically in the United Kingdom and United States in the early summer of 2017.

In August 2017, it was announced that Keough had launched her own production company called Felix Culpa with producer Gina Gammell. The duo also announced plans to adapt three novels, including: Sweet Lamb of Heaven: A Novel, the graphic novel Heartthrob, and The Curse of Beauty: The Scandalous & Tragic Life of Audrey Munson, America's First Supermodel. That same month saw the release of Steven Soderbergh's heist comedy Logan Lucky, in which Keough portrayed Mellie Logan.

In 2018, Keough appeared in a number of films, including the independent drama-thriller Welcome the Stranger, followed by the Netflix-released thriller Hold the Dark, directed by Jeremy Saulnier, and the Barry Levinson-directed television film Paterno, a biographical film about Joe Paterno released through HBO in April 2018. In May 2018, Keough debuted two films at the 2018 Cannes Film Festival: Lars von Trier's controversial psychological horror film The House That Jack Built, which was subsequently given a limited release in the United States by IFC Films, and David Robert Mitchell's neo-noir Under the Silver Lake, which was given a limited release in April 2019.

Next, Keough starred in the lead role in the psychological horror film The Lodge (2019), portraying a woman raised in a cult. The film, which premiered at the 2019 Sundance Film Festival before being released theatrically in February 2020, garnered Keough praise, with Michael Roffman of Consequence of Sound deeming it a "career-best performance". Justin Chang of the Los Angeles Times also lauded her performance as the film's "strongest asset. [Keough] can seize and hold the screen with electrifying force." Keough subsequently had a lead role opposite Alicia Vikander in the thriller film Earthquake Bird, directed by Wash Westmoreland and based on the 2001 novel of the same name, which premiered at the British Film Institute in October 2019 before being released digitally via Netflix in mid-November 2019.

In early 2019, Keough was cast in the Netflix-produced psychological thriller The Devil All the Time, based on Donald Ray Pollock's 2011 novel of the same name. The project began filming in Alabama in the spring of that year, and premiered on Netflix in September 2020. On November 19, 2019, it was announced that Keough had joined the cast of the upcoming Amazon series Daisy Jones & the Six in a leading role, portraying a rock musician in the 1970s. She performed lead vocals on the album Aurora, the fictional album recorded by the band, which was released on March 1, 2023. In January 2020, the comedy-drama Zola, co-starring Keough as Stefani, premiered at the Sundance Film Festival.

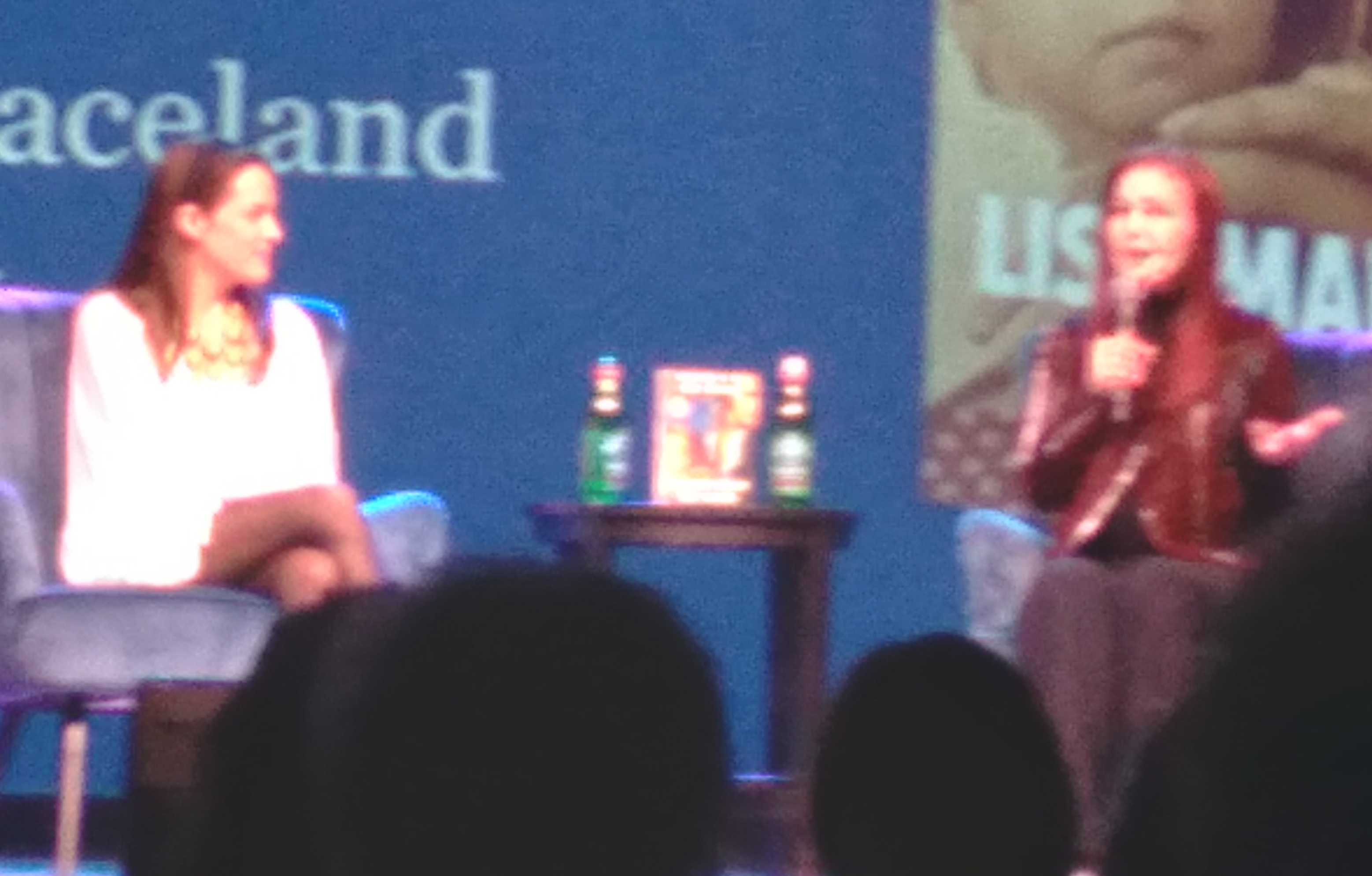
Keough (left) and Priscilla Presley (right) in October 2024

In 2022, Keough co-directed and produced with Gina Gammell War Pony, which had its world premiere at the 2022 Cannes Film Festival in May 2022. It won the Caméra d'Or award for best first feature. Keough also produced the 2023 film Manodrome as part of her production company, Felix Culpa.

In January 2024, Keough said that she completed her late mother Lisa Marie Presley's unfinished memoir, which was based on autobiographical audiotapes Presley recorded. The memoir was initially set to be released on October 15, 2024. Keough, along with Julia Roberts, provided the narration for its audiobook version. On June 4, 2024, it was revealed that the memoir would be titled From Here to the Great Unknown, and would credit both Keough and her mother as the book's authors. From Here to the Great Unknown would be released on October 8, 2024. On a primetime special titled The Presleys: Elvis, Lisa Marie and Riley, which aired on CBS on October 8, 2024, Keough spoke with Oprah Winfrey in her first public interview since her mother's death.

In October 2024, Keough made a surprise appearance at Chanel's Spring-Summer 2025 Ready to Wear show, where she performed a rendition of Prince's "When Doves Cry" during the show's closing. According to Keough, she received the invitation to perform only days before the show was scheduled to take place.

== Personal life ==
Keough dated singer Ryan Cabrera c. 2006. She was also engaged to her Magic Mike costar Alex Pettyfer in 2013. After breaking up with Pettyfer, she briefly reconnected with Cabrera.

In February 2015, Keough married Australian stuntman Ben Smith-Petersen in Napa, California, having announced their engagement the previous year. The couple had met while filming Mad Max: Fury Road. Their daughter was born in August 2022 via surrogate. In 2025 they had their second child via surrogacy.

Keough was raised in the Church of Scientology. As of 2023, she identifies as spiritual and not affiliated with any church.

Keough's younger brother Benjamin died by suicide at the age of 27 on July 12, 2020. Following his death, Keough became a certified death doula to help others process grief. Her mother Lisa Marie Presley died from cardiac arrest and complications from a bariatric surgery on January 12, 2023, at age 54. At the memorial service, Smith-Petersen delivered a speech written by Keough on her behalf. She is now the sole guardian of the Graceland estate and presides over the sub-trusts of her living siblings, each inheriting one-third of their mother's estate including Graceland and the Elvis estate.

== Filmography ==
=== Film ===
Key
†	Denotes films that have not yet been released

Year	Title	Role	Notes	Ref.
2010	The Runaways	Marie Currie	Debut film	
2011	The Good Doctor	Diane Nixon		
2011	Jack & Diane	Jack		
2012	Magic Mike	Nora		
2012	Yellow	Young Amanda		
2012	Kiss of the Damned	Anne		
2015	Mad Max: Fury Road	Capable		
2015	Dixieland	Rachel		
2016	Lovesong	Sarah		
2016	American Honey	Krystal		
2017	The Discovery	Lacey		
2017	We Don't Belong Here	Elisa Green		
2017	It Comes at Night	Kim		
2017	Logan Lucky	Mellie Logan		
2018	Welcome the Stranger	Misty	Also producer	
2018	The House That Jack Built	Jacqueline "Simple"		
2018	Under the Silver Lake	Sarah		
2018	Hold the Dark	Medora Sloane		
2019	The Lodge	Grace Marshall		
2019	Earthquake Bird	Lily Bridges		
2020	Zola	Stefani		
2020	The Devil All the Time	Sandy Henderson		
2021	The Guilty	Emily Lighton (voice)		
2022	War Pony	—N/a	Co-director, co-writer and producer	
2023	Manodrome	Mother	Cameo; also producer	
2024	Sasquatch Sunset	Female Sasquatch	Also executive producer	
2025	Hurry Up Tomorrow	Girl on Voicemail / Mother (voice)		
2025	Jay Kelly	Jessica Kelly		
2026	Rosebush Pruning	Anna		
2026	Butterfly Jam	Zayla	Also executive producer	
2026	Alpha Gang †	Alpha Six	Completed	
TBA	Out of This World †	TBA	Post-production	

=== Television ===
Year	Title	Role	Notes	Ref.
2016	The Girlfriend Experience	Christine Reade	Main role (13 episodes)	
2018	Riverdale	Laurie Lake	Episode: "Chapter Forty-Two: The Man in Black"	
2018	Paterno	Sara Ganim	Television film	
2021	Calls	Rose (voice)	Episode: "The Beginning"	
2022	The Terminal List	Lauren Reece	Main role (8 episodes)	
2023	Daisy Jones & the Six	Daisy Jones	Miniseries (10 episodes)	
2024	Under the Bridge	Rebecca Godfrey	Main role (8 episodes); also executive producer	

=== Music videos ===
Year	Title	Artist	Role	Ref.
2013	"TKO"	Justin Timberlake	Girlfriend	
2016	"Muffins"	Them Guns	Herself	
2022	"Hexie Mountains"	Orville Peck	Woman	
2025	"I Love You"	Tobias Jesso Jr.	Herself	

== Accolades ==
Year	Association	Nominated work	Category	Result	Ref.
2012	Milano Film Festival	The Good Doctor	Best Supporting Actress	Nominated	
2017	Golden Globe Awards	The Girlfriend Experience	Best Actress – Miniseries or Television Film	Nominated	
2017	Gracie Awards	The Girlfriend Experience	Actress in a Leading Role – Made for TV Movie or Limited Series	Won	
2017	Independent Spirit Awards	American Honey	Best Supporting Female	Nominated	
2017	London Film Critics Circle Awards	American Honey	Supporting Actress of the Year	Nominated	
2017	Village Voice Film Poll	American Honey	Best Supporting Actress	9th place	
2021	Chicago Film Critics Association	Zola	Best Supporting Actress	Nominated	
2022	Cannes Film Festival	War Pony	Un Certain Regard Award	Nominated	
2022	Cannes Film Festival	War Pony	Caméra d'Or	Won	
2023	MTV Movie & TV Awards	Daisy Jones & the Six	Best Performance in a Show	Nominated	
2023	MTV Movie & TV Awards	Daisy Jones & the Six	Best Kiss (with Sam Claflin)	Nominated	
2023	Primetime Emmy Awards	Daisy Jones & the Six	Outstanding Lead Actress In A Limited Or Anthology Series Or Movie	Nominated	
2024	Golden Globe Awards	Daisy Jones & the Six	Best Actress – Miniseries or Television Film	Nominated	

== Sources ==
- Dundy, Elaine (2004). Elvis and Gladys (2nd ed.). Jackson, Mississippi: University Press of Mississippi. ISBN 1-57806-634-4.
