= Lights Out (Lisa Marie Presley song) =

2003 single by Lisa Marie Presley

Single by Lisa Marie Presley

from the album To Whom It May Concern
- B-side: "Savior"
- Released: February 10, 2003
- Genre: Country rock; pop
- Length: 3:44
- Label: Capitol
- Songwriters: Lisa Marie Presley; Glen Ballard; Clif Magness
- Producer: Andrew Slater

Lisa Marie Presley singles chronology
"Lights Out" (2003)	"Sinking In" (2003)

Audio
- "Lights Out" on YouTube

"Lights Out" is a song by American singer Lisa Marie Presley. Capitol Records released the song as the lead single from her debut album, To Whom It May Concern (2003). Presley originally did not want to release this song as her debut single nor record it, but she relented as she believed it would help "clear the air". She co-wrote the song with Glen Ballard and Clif Magness, and it was produced by Andrew Slater. "Lights Out" is a country rock song that reflects on Presley's background as Elvis Presley's daughter, mentioning Graceland's back lawn and the graves of her relatives.

In the United States, "Lights Out" was released on February 10, 2003, and it was issued in several other countries over the following months. The song received positive reviews from music critics, with several reviewers comparing Presley's vocals to those of Cher. Commercially, "Lights Out" peaked at number 14 on the US Billboard Bubbling Under Hot 100 chart and achieved top-40 placings on two other Billboard charts. Internationally, the single reached the top 30 in Australia, Canada, New Zealand, and the United Kingdom. A music video directed by Francis Lawrence was made to promote the single.

== Background and release ==
Speaking of "Lights Out", Lisa Marie Presley said that she initially never wanted to make a song that mentioned her heritage, but the song takes on a darker tone that Presley wanted to establish, as she did not want the lyrics to reflect on her background in a positive light. Presley wrote the song alongside Glen Ballard and Clif Magness. In the United States, the song was originally scheduled for a radio release on January 27, 2003, but it was delayed to February 10, 2003. Presley stated that she did not want Capitol Records to release "Lights Out" as her debut single since it talked about her family, including her father, Elvis Presley. She explained, "My concern was that it would go against everything I'm trying to do now, which is make my own thumbprint. By the end, though, I saw that it might help clear the air". In Australia, the song was released as a CD single on April 7, 2003, and on June 30, 2003, a CD and DVD single were issued in the United Kingdom.

== Composition ==
"Lights Out" is a country rock and pop song. New York Times critic Anthony DeCurtis has described it as an "easy-rolling, roots-oriented guitar groove". Its lyrics talk about the graves of Presley's family at Graceland, referring to the "damn back lawn" of the estate. Set in common time, the song is written in the key of D major and possesses a moderate tempo of 112 beats per minute.

== Critical reception ==
"Lights Out" was positively received by music critics. Chuck Taylor of Billboard magazine called the song's country-rock sound a "perfect" emulation of Elvis Presley while another Billboard reviewer, Ray Waddell, labeled it a "real powerhouse". Nigel Patterson of the Elvis Information Network wrote that "Lights Out" was a good debut for Presley and also commended B-side "Savior" for complementing "Lights Out" appealingly. He went on to note the song's "infectious" beat and "searing" lyrics and said that the song was good choice for radio airplay, citing its multi-generational appeal. ElvisNews.com compared Presley's vocals on the song to those of Shania Twain, Wynonna Judd, and especially Cher, recalling her version of Marc Cohn's "Walking in Memphis". Taylor described her voice as a cross between Cher and Patty Smyth.

== Chart performance ==
"Lights Out" did not appear on the US Billboard Hot 100 chart, stalling at number 14 on the Billboard Bubbling Under Hot 100 on May 18, 2003, and remaining on the listing for five issues. It fared well on other Billboard charts, peaking at number 18 on the Adult Top 40 and number 34 on the Mainstream Top 40 during May 2003. In Canada, it was released as a CD single, allowing it to chart on the Canadian Singles Chart and peak at number 12 on April 26, 2003. In Europe, the song managed to chart in the United Kingdom, where it debuted and peaked at number 16 on the UK Singles Chart on July 6, 2003. On the Eurochart Hot 100, it appeared at number 61 on July 19, 2003. The song also charted in Australia and New Zealand. In the former country, it debuted at its peak of number 29 on April 20, 2003, and spent two more nonconsecutive weeks within the top 50. In New Zealand, it peaked one place higher at number 28 and remained on the chart for 10 weeks throughout April, May, and June 2003.

== Track listings ==
International CD single

1. "Lights Out" – 3:44
2. "Savior" – 3:19

UK and European DVD single

1. "Lights Out" (video)
2. About "Lights Out"
3. "Savior"

== Personnel ==
Personnel are taken from the international CD single liner notes.

- Lisa Marie Presley – writing, vocals
- Glen Ballard – writing
- Clif Magness – writing
- Andrew Slater – production, executive production
- Howard Willing – recording, additional recording and editing
- Eric Rosse – additional recording and editing
- Tom Lord-Alge – mixing

== Charts ==
=== Weekly charts ===
Weekly chart performance for "Lights Out"
Chart (2003)	Peak position
Australia (ARIA)	29
Canada (Nielsen SoundScan)	12
Europe (Eurochart Hot 100)	61
New Zealand (Recorded Music NZ)	28
Scotland Singles (Official Charts)	14
UK Singles (Official Charts)	16
US Bubbling Under Hot 100 (Billboard)	14
US Adult Pop Airplay (Billboard)	18
US Pop Airplay (Billboard)	34

=== Weekly charts ===
Year-end chart performance for "Lights Out"
Chart (2003)	Position
US Adult Top 40 (Billboard)	63

== Release history ==
Release history and formats for "Lights Out"
Region	Date	Format(s)	Label(s)	ID	Ref(s).
United States	February 10, 2003	Contemporary hit; hot AC radio	Capitol	—N/a	
Australia	April 7, 2003	CD	Capitol	7243 5 52108 2 1	
United States	May 5, 2003	Country radio	Capitol	—N/a	
United Kingdom	June 30, 2003	CD	Capitol	CDCL 844	
United Kingdom	June 30, 2003	DVD	Capitol	DVDCL 844	
