= Priscilla Presley =

American businesswoman and actress (born 1945)

- Priscilla in 2022
- Born: Priscilla Ann Wagner; May 24, 1945 (age 81); New York City, New York, U.S.
- Other names: Priscilla Wagner; Priscilla Beaulieu
- Occupations: Actress; businesswoman
- Years active: 1973–present
- Spouse: Elvis Presley (m. 1967; div. 1973)
- Partner: Marco Garibaldi (1984–2006)
- Children: Lisa Marie Presley; Navarone Garibaldi
- Relatives: Riley Keough (granddaughter)

Priscilla Ann Presley (née Wagner, formerly Beaulieu; born May 24, 1945) is an American businesswoman and actress. She is the former wife of Elvis Presley, to whom she was married from 1967 to 1973 and with whom she had one daughter, Lisa Marie Presley. Priscilla later co-founded and chaired Elvis Presley Enterprises (EPE), which oversaw the public opening of her previous home, Graceland, as a museum.

As an actress, she portrayed Jane Spencer in The Naked Gun film series (1988–2025) and Jenna Wade on the CBS primetime soap Dallas (1983–1988).

== Early life ==
Priscilla Ann Wagner was born on May 24, 1945, at Brooklyn Naval Hospital in New York City. Her maternal grandfather, Albert Henry Iversen, was originally from Egersund, Norway, and later emigrated to the United States, where he married Lorraine Davis, who was of Scots-Irish and English descent. Their only daughter, Anna Lillian Iversen, later known as Ann, was Priscilla's mother. Priscilla's biological father, James Frederick Wagner, was a U.S. Navy pilot from Cherrytree Township, Pennsylvania. He married Ann on August 10, 1944. Wagner died in a plane crash on November 3, 1945, when Priscilla was five months old.

In 1948, Ann married United States Air Force officer Paul Beaulieu, a native of Québec, Canada. The couple raised Priscilla, along with half-siblings Donald, Michelle, Jeffrey, and twins Thomas and Timothy. Priscilla's surname was legally changed to Beaulieu on April 17, 1950. Due to her stepfather's military career, the family relocated frequently. In an interview with The Wall Street Journal, Priscilla stated, "We moved around a lot, and I didn’t stay in one school long enough to make close friends. I was quite shy when I was young, and I dreaded lunchtime at school. I often ate alone."

In 1956, the family settled in Del Valle, Texas, before Beaulieu was reassigned to Wiesbaden, West Germany. Upon arriving in West Germany, the Beaulieu family initially stayed at the Helene Hotel. After three months, the cost proved unsustainable, prompting them to search for a rental property. They eventually moved into a spacious apartment in a "vintage building constructed long before World War I." Shortly after settling in, they discovered that the building also operated as a brothel, but due to limited housing availability, they remained there.

== Life with Elvis ==
=== West Germany ===
On September 13, 1959, Priscilla, then 14, met Elvis Presley, then 24, at his rented home in Bad Nauheim, West Germany, where he was stationed during his military service. She was introduced by Currie Grant, a U.S. Air Force officer. Priscilla met Presley several times after their initial meeting. During one of these early visits, he invited her upstairs to speak privately and shared memories of his mother, Gladys Presley, who had died in August 1958. Before she left, he kissed her goodbye—this was reportedly her first kiss. After their fourth date, her father stated that if the relationship was to continue, he wanted to meet Presley in person. Presley agreed and arrived in his Army uniform, accompanied by his father. During the meeting, Priscilla's parents outlined expectations for future visits, including transportation and curfews. Presley acknowledged their concerns and offered reassurances, allowing the relationship to continue under agreed conditions. Priscilla and Presley spent considerable time together until his departure from West Germany on March 2, 1960.

After Presley left Germany, Priscilla remained at home, unable to eat and struggling with insomnia. At school, she was approached by reporters asking whether he had called and noting that Nancy Sinatra had met him at the airport. Believing their relationship had ended, Priscilla feared she would not see him again. She was also concerned about Presley resuming his relationship with Anita Wood, whom he had dated before and after his overseas service. Twenty-one days after Presley left Germany, Priscilla received a phone call from him in the early morning. Their communication thereafter became sporadic, with calls arriving unexpectedly after long intervals.

=== Move to Graceland ===
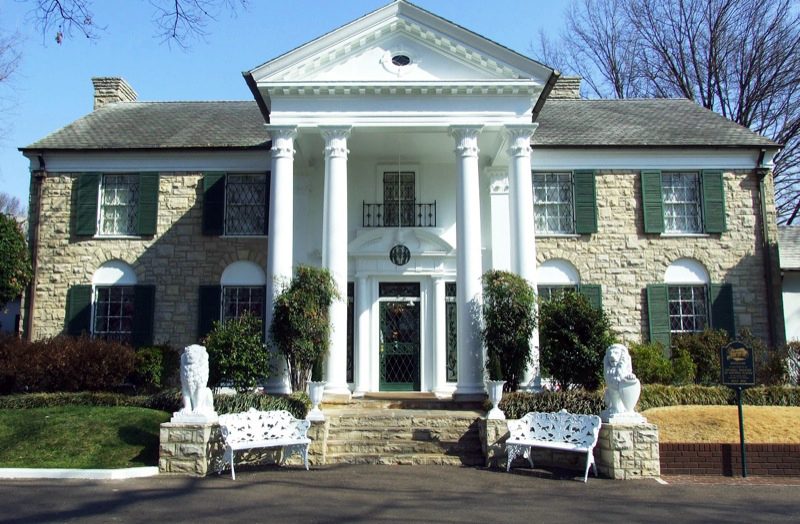
Graceland in 2011

In February 1962, after months without contact, Presley called Priscilla and suggested she visit him in Los Angeles. She was unsure her father would agree, but Presley made repeated calls to reassure her parents. He accepted all conditions: waiting until summer break, providing a first-class round-trip ticket, sending a detailed itinerary, ensuring constant chaperoning, and requiring daily letters home. Priscilla counted down the days until the visit. When she arrived, she was met by Joe Esposito and driven to Presley's home. Soon after, Presley invited her to join him on a trip to Las Vegas, deviating from the agreed itinerary. To avoid detection, Priscilla prewrote letters and arranged for them to be mailed from Los Angeles while she was away.

During the Las Vegas visit, Priscilla began using amphetamines and sleeping pills to adjust to Presley's nocturnal lifestyle. After a second visit at Christmas, her parents agreed to let her relocate to Memphis permanently in mid-March 1963, two months before her 18th birthday. As part of the arrangement, Presley was expected to marry her. Priscilla enrolled at the Immaculate Conception Cathedral School, an all-girls Catholic institution, and initially lived with Presley's father and stepmother. She spent increasing time at Graceland with Presley's grandmother, Minnie Mae Presley, gradually moving her belongings in until she was living there full-time.

Priscilla wanted to accompany Presley to Hollywood, but he repeatedly told her he was too busy and asked her to remain in Memphis. During that period, she read reports of an affair between Presley and his Viva Las Vegas co-star Ann-Margret. She confronted him, and he dismissed the stories as publicity-driven rumours, advising her not to trust the press. Over the following years, Presley had multiple intimate relationships with co-stars, though he denied each of them to Priscilla. She was eventually permitted to visit him in Hollywood, but her stays were brief.

=== Marriage and pregnancy ===
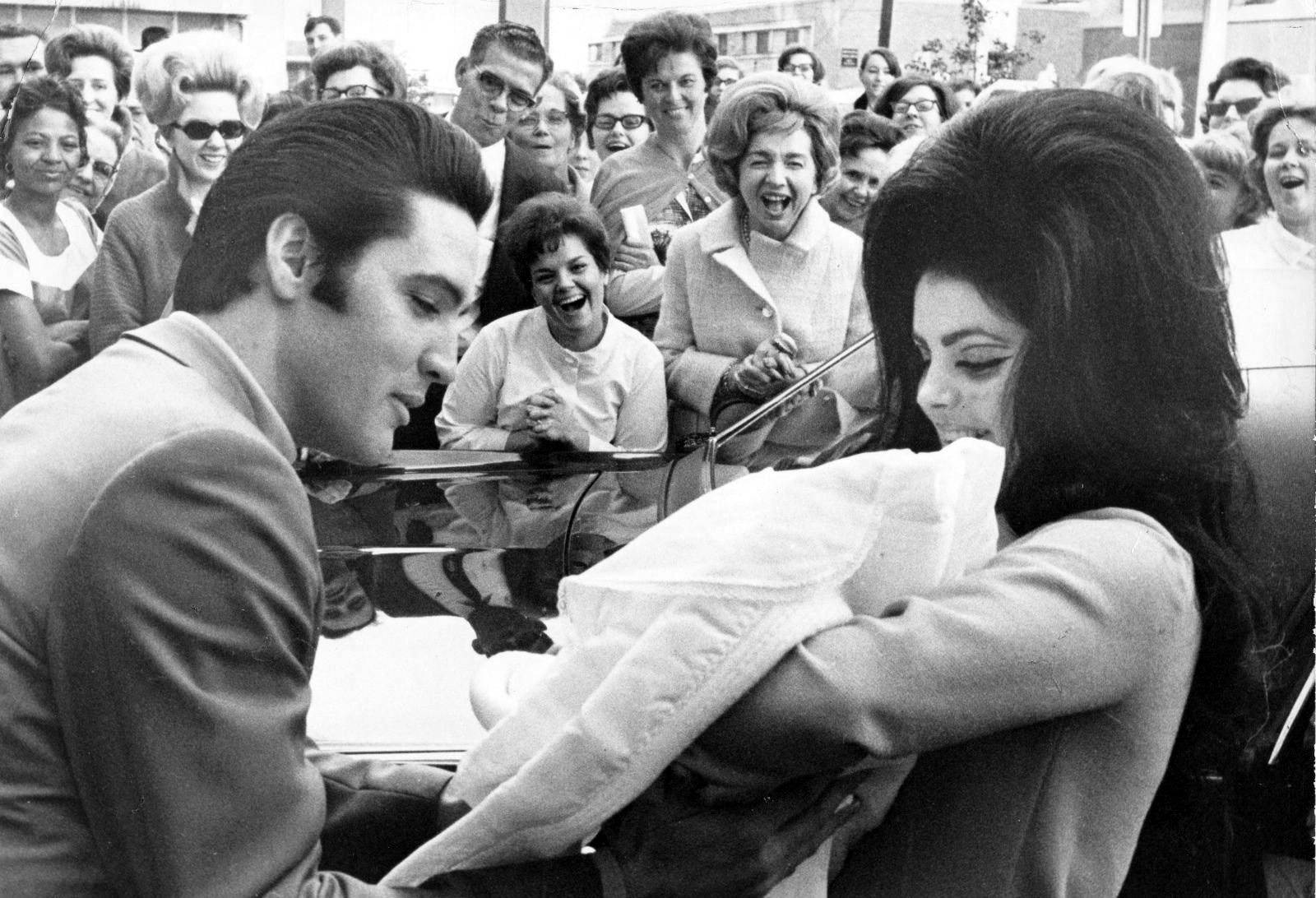
The couple with their newborn, Lisa Marie, in February 1968

Shortly before Christmas 1966, Presley proposed to Priscilla, reportedly after Colonel Tom Parker reminded him of RCA's "morals clause" in his record contract. In a 1973 interview with Ladies' Home Journal, Priscilla said they were content living together but noted that "at that time, it wasn't nice for people to [just] live together". Accounts of Presley's attitude toward marriage differ: his cook Alberta and friend Marty Lacker described him as reluctant, while others, including Esposito, claimed he was excited to marry Priscilla.

In her memoir Elvis and Me, Priscilla wrote that Presley was passionate but insisted they wait until marriage before having intercourse, stating, "I'm not saying we can't do other things. It's just the actual encounter. I want to save it." Priscilla said she was a virgin when she married and that she and Presley did not have sex until their wedding night. Biographer Suzanne Finstad alleged Priscilla had been sexually active earlier with Presley and with her high school boyfriends in Germany. However, Finstad's book Child Bride: The Untold Story of Priscilla Beaulieu Presley relied heavily on statements made by former Presley Army acquaintance Currie Grant, who was also cited as the source of the claim that Priscilla admitted to having sex with Presley in Germany. In August 1998, in a ruling concerning a lawsuit over another claim Grant made in the book, regarding an alleged affair between him and Priscilla before her marriage, a judge found that Grant made false statements that were repeated and used as "the source" for Child Bride.

Presley and Priscilla married on May 1, 1967, at the Aladdin Hotel in Las Vegas. The ceremony, arranged by Parker for publicity, lasted eight minutes and was followed by a press conference and a $10,000 breakfast reception attended by representatives from MGM, RCA, and the William Morris Agency.

After the reception, Presley and Priscilla honeymooned briefly in Palm Springs before returning to Memphis on May 4. They spent three weeks at their private ranch near the Mississippi border, largely alone, though some members of Presley's inner circle joined them. To address tensions over the limited wedding guest list, the couple hosted a second reception at Graceland on May 29 for those not invited to the ceremony.

Priscilla soon learned she was pregnant. Concerned that it might affect their relationship, she considered an abortion, but she and Presley ultimately decided against it. Their daughter, Lisa Marie Presley, was born on February 1, 1968, nine months after their wedding.

=== Separation and divorce ===
While Presley was filming Live a Little, Love a Little (1968), Priscilla began private dance lessons and developed a brief romantic relationship with her instructor, referred to as "Mark" in Elvis and Me. She later expressed regret. Despite affairs on both sides, the early years of their marriage were reportedly happy. After Presley's 1968 television special, his career resurged, and he spent increasing time touring and performing in Las Vegas, while Priscilla remained at home with their daughter.

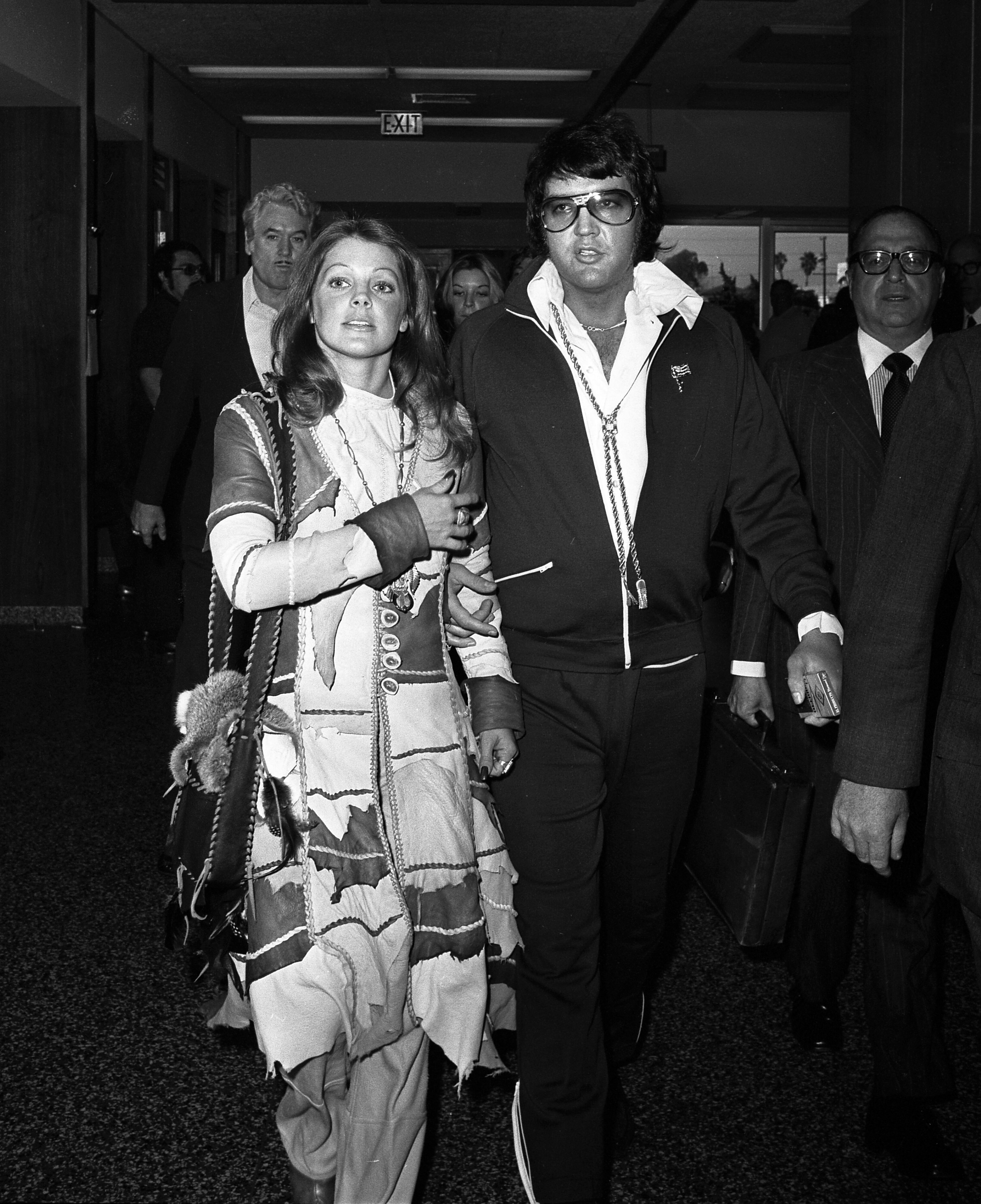
Priscilla and Presley in October 1973 after their divorce was finalized

Encouraged by Presley, Priscilla took up karate to share his interests and occupy her time. In 1968, she saw Mike Stone for the first time during her second honeymoon in Hawaii. In 1972, she met instructor Stone backstage at one of Elvis's concerts and began an affair. However, the year 1972 is not confirmed by Stone, who wrote that he met Priscilla for the second time at a karate event at Bolsa Chica High School on May 15, 1971. She later wrote, "I still loved Elvis, greatly, but over the next few months, I knew I would have to make a crucial decision regarding my destiny." According to her memoir, Presley later summoned her to his hotel suite and "forcefully made love to me...[saying] 'This is how a real man makes love to his woman'". In a later interview, Priscilla said she regretted her phrasing, calling it an overstatement. Jerry Schilling stated that Priscilla and Presley spoke in his dressing room, not in his suite.

Priscilla wrote that Presley's attempt at reconciliation came too late and lacked sensitivity. She cited his earlier comment that he had "never been able to make love to a woman who had a child" and described the emotional impact of their sexual difficulties: "I am beginning to doubt my own sexuality, as a woman. My physical and emotional needs were unfulfilled." She concluded, "this was not the gentle, understanding man I grew to love." Years later, on Loose Women, Priscilla said she and Presley did have sex after Lisa Marie was born.

The couple separated on February 23, 1972, and filed for legal separation on July 26. Priscilla sued Presley for fraud to reopen the divorce by default in May 1973. The divorce was finalized on October 9, 1973.

Priscilla and Presley agreed to share custody of Lisa Marie. She received a $725,000 cash settlement, spousal and child support, 5% of Presley's new publishing companies, and half the proceeds from the sale of their Beverly Hills home. The initial settlement had been smaller, but after consulting new lawyers, Priscilla revised her requests, stating that Presley could provide more. The couple remained close, leaving the courthouse hand-in-hand on the day their divorce was finalized.

== Personal life ==
Since her divorce from Presley in 1973, Priscilla has had several long-term relationships but has not remarried. Immediately afterward, she lived with Stone, but the relationship ended by 1975.

Beginning in 1978, Priscilla had a six-year intermittent live-in relationship with model Michael Edwards, which ended after he began developing feelings for the teenage Lisa Marie.

Priscilla's longest relationship was with Brazilian screenwriter-turned-computer-programmer Marco Antonio Garcia (also known as Marco Garibaldi), with whom she lived for 22 years. The two were introduced by a mutual friend in 1984 after he wrote a script that she read, hoping to produce. Their son, Navarone Garibaldi, was born on March 1, 1987. Priscilla was starring in the primetime soap opera Dallas at the time, and her pregnancy was written into the storyline. In 2006, they ended their relationship. Early in their relationship, Priscilla had Garibaldi sign a promissory agreement stating that if they separated, he would not write a book about her.

Through her daughter, Lisa Marie, Priscilla has four grandchildren, including actress Riley Keough. Priscilla became a great-grandmother through Riley Keough in 2022. Her daughter, Lisa Marie, died from complications of bariatric surgery on January 12, 2023, at age 54. In 2023, it was agreed that Priscilla would be buried close to Presley, though not next to him, at Graceland's Meditation Garden.

== Business ==
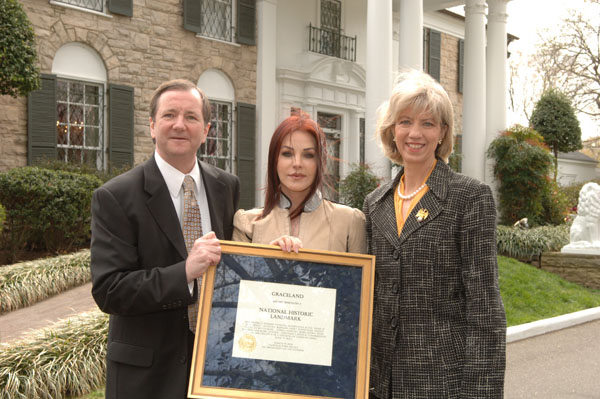
Designation of Graceland mansion as a National Historic Landmark in 2006, l-r Jack Soden, Priscilla and United States Secretary of the Interior Gale Norton

In 1973, following her separation from Presley, Priscilla opened a Los Angeles clothing boutique, Bis & Beau, with her friend and stylist Olivia Bis. Promoting the launch, she said: "After the separation, I had to make up my mind about what I wanted to do, and since I had worked with Olivia for such a long time on my own clothes, I decided to try it professionally. We both do the designing for the shop, and have people who sew for us." Presley supported the venture and contacted several friends in public relations to help promote the opening. The boutique proved successful, attracting celebrity clients such as Diana Ross, Carol Burnett, Jill Ireland, Mary Tyler Moore, Victoria Principal, Michelle Phillips, Dyan Cannon, Julie Christie, Suzanne Pleshette, Cher, Liza Minnelli, Lana Turner, Barbra Streisand, and Natalie Wood. It closed in 1976.

After Presley's death in 1977, his father Vernon served as one of the executors of the estate, held in trust for Lisa Marie. Vernon named Priscilla as his successor, and she assumed the role after his death in 1979. Graceland required $500,000 a year in upkeep, and expenses had reduced Lisa Marie's inheritance to $1 million. Taxes and other costs amounted to more than $500,000. Facing the possibility of selling Graceland, Priscilla examined other public homes and museums. She hired CEO Jack Soden to develop Graceland as a tourist attraction. It opened to the public on June 7, 1982, and within four weeks the estate had recouped its investment. Priscilla became chairperson and president of Elvis Presley Enterprises (EPE), stating she would remain until Lisa Marie turned 21. Under her leadership, the trust grew to more than $100 million.

In 1988, Priscilla launched her first fragrance, Moments, followed by a series of successful perfumes in the 1990s: Experiences (1993), Indian Summer (1996), and Roses and More (1998). She has also sold products on the Home Shopping Network, coached by veteran host Bob Circosta.

In 2006, she traveled to Sydney, Australia, for the debut of her worldwide bed‑linen line, the Priscilla Presley Collection, created in partnership with Australian designer Bruno Schiavi. She has helped produce feature films including Breakfast with Einstein and Finding Graceland. In September 2000, she was elected to the board of directors at Metro-Goldwyn-Mayer. In 2015, she became executive producer of If I Can Dream: Elvis Presley With the Royal Philharmonic Orchestra, a 14-track album. She said, "If Elvis were here, he would be evolving and taking risks, seemingly like everybody else today". That year she also joined U.S. Postmaster General Megan Brennan to dedicate a Presley "forever" stamp, featuring a 1955 photograph by William Speer. It was her second dedication of a USPS stamp honoring Presley; lobbying for a Presley stamp had begun in 1988.

On August 16, 2019, it was announced that Priscilla, working with John Eddie and Sony Pictures, would create and produce Agent Elvis, a Netflix adult animated series portraying Presley as a musician by day and spy by night. The first teaser was released on the official Presley Instagram account on June 15, 2022, showing an illustrated Presley in a black trench coat. Priscilla voiced her own character in the series. On September 23, 2025, she published a memoir titled Softly As I Leave You: Life After Elvis.

== Acting career ==
Priscilla had shown an interest in dancing and modelling and had modeled for a local store once. Hal B. Wallis, a Hollywood producer who financed many of Presley's earlier films, expressed interest in signing Priscilla to a contract. During her marriage, she did not pursue acting or modeling professionally, calling them hobbies. She was sensitive to Presley's opinion, as he did not want her to have her own career, repeating the then‑popular saying, "A woman's place is in the home looking after her man". Priscilla neither pursued fashion modeling nor signed exclusive contracts, choosing instead to comply with her husband's wishes.

She was originally offered the lead role of Jill Munore on Charlie's Angels but turned it down because she disliked the show. She made her television debut as co-host of Those Amazing Animals in 1980. In 1983, she had her first professional acting role in a season-two episode of The Fall Guy titled "Manhunter". She then appeared in the television film Love is Forever, starring alongside Michael Landon. Although her acting was praised by several co‑stars, she found Landon difficult to work with. After the film aired, Priscilla took on the role of Jenna Wade in the primetime soap opera Dallas. As the third actor to portray Jenna (after Morgan Fairchild and Francine Tacker), she played the role the longest, becoming a series regular. In 1988, after five years, she left the show. During her tenure, she was offered the role of Bond girl Stacey Sutton in A View to a Kill (1985), but declined due to scheduling conflicts. The role went to former Charlie's Angels star Tanya Roberts.

In 1988, Priscilla starred opposite Leslie Nielsen in The Naked Gun: From the Files of Police Squad! as Jane Spencer. Critic Roger Ebert praised her performance, noting that her "light comic touch" helped balance the film's broader humor. She appeared in the next three films in the series: The Naked Gun 2½: The Smell of Fear (1991), Naked Gun 33⅓: The Final Insult (1994), and The Naked Gun (2025). All performed well at the box office. In between, she acted in The Adventures of Ford Fairlane (1990) with Andrew Dice Clay. During the mid-to-late-1990s, she made guest appearances on Melrose Place, Touched by an Angel, and Spin City.

Priscilla made her pantomime debut in Snow White and the Seven Dwarfs at the New Wimbledon Theatre in London during Christmas 2012, starring opposite Warwick Davis. She reprised her role as the Wicked Queen at the Manchester Opera House in 2014.

A biopic focusing on her relationship with Presley, Priscilla, was directed by Sofia Coppola. It is based on her memoir Elvis and Me, and she served as executive producer.

== Charity work and activism ==
Since 2003, Priscilla has been the Ambassador of the Dream Foundation, a Santa Barbara-based wish-granting organization for terminally ill adults and their families.

Priscilla joined the Church of Scientology with her daughter after Presley's death. In 2006, she helped inaugurate Narconon's Stonehawk Rehabilitation Center in Michigan. When Lisa Marie left Scientology in 2016, reports suggested Priscilla had also distanced herself, though in October 2017 her representative denied she had left.

In 2013, Priscilla spoke out against an agricultural gag law that would have criminalized unauthorized filming or recording on farms. In a letter to Tennessee Governor Bill Haslam, she cited her and Presley's love of horses and expressed concern that the bill would hinder animal‑cruelty investigations and reduce protections for horses and other farm animals.

== Honors ==
Priscilla received an honorary Doctor of Humanities degree from Rhodes College in 1998. She was named godmother of the largest river steamboat ever built, American Queen, christened on April 27, 2012, at its home port in Memphis. The AutoZone Liberty Bowl selected her as its 2018 Distinguished Citizen Award recipient. On July 22, 2022, Theatre Memphis honored her contributions to Memphis art and tourism with a gala titled "Honoring Priscilla Presley: The Artist, The Woman", featuring more than a dozen speakers and a live musical tribute. She has a square named after her in Egersund, Norway, "Priscilla Presleys plass", located outside the house where her grandfather was born in 1899. In 2025, she received Tennessee's highest civilian award for her contributions to the state's cultural heritage and her role in preserving Graceland as a historic landmark.

== Filmography ==
=== Film ===
Year	Title	Role	Notes
1988	The Naked Gun: From the Files of Police Squad!	Jane Spencer	
1990	The Adventures of Ford Fairlane	Colleen Sutton	
1991	The Naked Gun 2 1/2: The Smell of Fear	Jane Spencer	Nominated for a MTV Movie Award for Best Kiss
1994	Naked Gun 33 1/3: The Final Insult	Jane Spencer-Drebin	
2025	The Naked Gun	Jane Spencer-Drebin	Cameo

=== Television ===
Year	Title	Role	Notes
1980–1981	Those Amazing Animals	Co-host	
1983	Love Is Forever	Sandy Redford	TV film
1983	The Fall Guy	Sabrina Coldwell	Episode: "Manhunter"
1983–1988	Dallas	Jenna Wade	Series regular, 143 episodes Soap Opera Digest Award for New Actress in a Prime Time Soap Opera (1984)
1993	Tales from the Crypt	Gina	Episode: "Oil's Well That Ends Well"
1996	Melrose Place	Nurse Benson	Episodes: "Peter's Excellent Adventure" "Full Metal Betsy" "Dead Sisters Walking"
1997	Touched by an Angel	Dr. Meg Saulter	Episode: "Labor of Love"
1998	Breakfast with Einstein	Keelin	TV film
1999	Spin City	Aunt Marie Paterno	Episodes: "Dick Clark's Rockin' Make-Out Party '99" and "Back to the Future IV: Judgment Day"
1999	Hayley Wagner, Star	Sue Wagner	TV film
2008	Dancing with the Stars	Herself	Season 6, placed 8th
2019	Wedding at Graceland	Herself	TV film
2019	Christmas at Graceland: Home for the Holidays	Herself	TV film
2023	Agent Elvis	Herself	Also co-creator, executive producer

== Portrayals ==
Since 1979, Priscilla has been portrayed in several screen and TV films focusing on various aspects of her life with Presley. Actresses who played Priscilla include Season Hubley in Elvis, the 1979 TV movie; Susan Walters in Elvis and Me, a 1988 TV miniseries; Kehli O'Byrnein in Elvis and the Colonel, a 1993 TV movie; Alyson Court in Elvis Meets Nixon, 1997; Antonia Barnath in Elvis, a 2006 TV miniseries; Ashley Greene in Shangri-La Suite, 2016; Olivia DeJonge in Elvis, 2022; and Cailee Spaeny in Priscilla, 2023.

== Books written ==
- Presley, Priscilla (1985). Elvis and Me. Putnam. ISBN 0-399-12984-7.
- Presley, Priscilla; Presley, Lisa Marie (2005). Elvis by the Presleys. Crown. ISBN 0-307-23741-9.
- Presley, Priscilla (2025). Softly, As I Leave You: Life After Elvis. Grand Central Publishing. ISBN 978-0306836480.
