= You Ain't Seen Nothin' Yet (Lisa Marie Presley song) =

Single by Lisa Marie Presley

from the album Storm & Grace
- Released: April 10, 2012
- Recorded: 2012
- Length: 3:46
- Label: Universal Republic Records
- Songwriters: Lisa Marie Presley, James Bryan McCollum, Sacha Skarbek
- Producer: T-Bone Burnett

Lisa Marie Presley singles chronology
""In the Ghetto" (with Elvis Presley)" (2007)	"You Ain't Seen Nothin' Yet" (2012)

"You Ain't Seen Nothin' Yet" is a song performed by Lisa Marie Presley, written by Presley, James Bryan McCollum and Sacha Skarbek. It is from her Storm & Grace album, and was released as a single on April 10, 2012. The song was described by the Presley Foundation's own website as having an "ominous, swampy vibe."

The single failed to chart, but the "smoky, spooky" single was well received by Entertainment Weekly. Presley made a guest appearance on American Idol on May 17, 2012, performing the song.
