= Navarone Garibaldi =

American musician (born 1987)

- Born: Navarone Anthony Garibaldi Garcia; March 1, 1987 (age 39); Santa Monica, California, U.S.
- Genre: Rock
- Occupation: Singer
- Member of: Them Guns

Navarone Anthony Garibaldi Garcia (born March 1, 1987) is an American musician who is the lead singer of the group Them Guns. He is the son of Priscilla Presley and is the half-brother of the late Lisa Marie Presley, daughter of singer Elvis Presley.

== Early life ==
Garibaldi was born to actress Priscilla Presley and computer programmer Marco Garibaldi Garcia in Santa Monica, California. As his mother was the former wife of Elvis Presley, media scrutiny was often focused on the family. Garibaldi's half-sister was Lisa Marie Presley, Elvis's only child.

== Them Guns ==
Them Guns is a Los Angeles-based rock band. Santa Cruz Waves described their sound as "... a rock base, a tinge of surf/ska vocals, and funked out keys, a sound to satisfy the traditional, to alternative, to psychedelic rock music enthusiasts [...] birthed from the barrels of Them Guns".

Garibaldi cites his musical influences as "Nine Inch Nails, Nirvana, Kings of Leon to the likes of the Chemical Brothers".

In the United States, Them Guns have had sold-out shows at The Viper Room, The Troubadour in West Hollywood. Their UK debut was on April 4, 2013, at The Kings Head Club in Hoxton, east London.

== Personal life ==
Garibaldi is a reptile lover and collects reticulated pythons and Asian water monitors.
