= Music of Rhode Island =

Rhode Island, a state of the United States in the New England region, is known for a diverse and thriving music scene.

== History ==
In 1733, the first organ said to be designed for church use, was installed at Trinity Church in Newport.

In the late 1990s, the state's music scene, which is centered around the capital city of Providence, became nationally known for the noise rock scene that revolved around the Fort Thunder artists' collective.

The state is home to a wide range of artists performing of a number of genres, most notably folk rock, jazz, hardcore punk, hip hop, and Cape Verdean music.

The state is known for the famous Newport Jazz and Newport Folk festivals.

== State song ==
In 1996, Rhode Island declared "Rhode Island, It's for Me" as the official state song. The lyrics were written by Charlie Hall, the music was written by Maria Day, and the piece was arranged by Kathryn Chester. "Rhode Island, It's for Me" replaced "Rhode Island", which was subsequently named the official state march.

== Other state-affiliated songs ==
=== "Rhode Island" ===
==== About ====
“Rhode Island", written by T. Clarke Browne, was the official state song for over 50 years, when it was replaced by "Rhode Island, It's For Me". It has since been renamed the official state march.

==== Lyrics ====
The following are the lyrics for the song "Rhode Island":

Here's to you, belov'd RHODE ISLAND,
With your Hills and Ocean Shore.
We are proud to hail you RHODY
And your patriots of yore.

First to claim your independence,
Great your heritage and fame.
The smallest State in all the Union,
We will glorify your name!

=== "Rhode Island Is Famous for You" ===
==== About ====
“Rhode Island Is Famous for You" was originally written by Howard Dietz and Arthur Schwartz in 1948, for Inside U.S.A., a 1940s Broadway show about the U.S. States. The number was performed by Estelle Loring, who was awarded a Theater World Award for the piece, and Jack Haley.

“Rhode Island Is Famous for You" also served as the theme song for Buddy Cianci's Radio Show, and was performed by Robert Goulet and Cianci himself at his 1995 mayoral inauguration.

The song has been covered by Blossom Dearie, Michael Feinstein, Nancy LaMott, Mandy Patinkin, John Pizzarelli, and Erin McKeown.

The song has recently been featured on the podcast Crimetown.

== Popular music ==
=== Providence ===
Providence, the state's capital, has a very strong local independent music scene, known especially for its contributions to the genre of noise rock, most notably the groups Lightning Bolt, Daughters, Black Dice, and Arab on Radar. Rap artists such as Sage Francis and John Phelps, formerly known as Lunchbagg, are among the notable figures combining DIY philosophy with Hip Hop. Other rap artists such as Dee Gomes, Jae Lynx, King OSF, J Duce, and Vick Mucka have grown prominent fan bases by representing the city's harsher neighborhoods and have gone on to sign with major record labels.

Other indie rock and alternative artists from the city include Les Savy Fav, Dicky Barrett (vocalist for ska group Mighty Mighty Bosstones), ZOX, The Low Anthem, Downtown Boys, and Deer Tick. Noise/Punk 5 piece, Hairspray Queen are also from varying neighborhoods in the City.

Singer-songwriter, musician, and lyricist Jeffrey Osborne was born and raised in Providence. Osborne spent over a decade as the drummer and lead vocalist for the American R&B/funk band L.T.D. Among his biggest hits with the group were "(Every Time I Turn Around) Back in Love Again" (1977), "Concentrate on You", "Love Ballad" (1976), and "Holding On (When Love Is Gone)" (1978). Osborne subsequently launched a successful solo career in 1982, charting with hit songs including "On the Wings of Love", "I Really Don't Need No Light" (No. 29 and No. 39, respectively, on the pop chart), "Don't You Get So Mad" (No. 25), "Stay with Me Tonight" (No. 30), "Plane Love" (No. 10 R&B, No. 6 dance), and "We're Going All the Way" (No. 48).

Based in Providence, the Rhode Island Philharmonic Orchestra is one of the most influential music institutions in the state.

==== College Hill ====
Rhode Island School of Design has been the alma mater of many popular musicians. Three members of Talking Heads met at the college, but did not form the band until they moved to New York City.

Notable musicians who attended Providence's Brown University include Wendy Carlos, Lisa Loeb, Mary Chapin Carpenter, OK Go singer Damian Kulash, Duncan Sheik, ZOX, Lawrence, and Will Oldham, who dropped out after one semester.

=== Newport ===
Newport has a much smaller scene, with Throwing Muses being its most successful rock band. The group formed in 1981 and recorded and toured until their hiatus in 2003. The band's lead guitarist and secondary songwriter, Tanya Donnelly also formed Belly, best known for their hit "Feed the Tree", which went to No. 1 on the Billboard Modern Rock chart in 1994. Donnelly was also briefly guitarist for The Breeders.

The singing family The Cowsills, who had Top 40 hits from 1967 to 1969 also are from Newport. They were the inspiration for the fictional Partridge Family.

Since 2000, Newport has cultivated a small ska punk scene, headed by the Sublime cover group Badfish and the punk band Big World.

Rockabilly singer Jody Gibson (née Joseph Paul Katzberg), who had a Gold Record with Good Morning Captain, spent much of his later life in Newport.

=== Rest of the state ===
Other well known Rhode Island musical artists from elsewhere in the state include John Cafferty, Blu Cantrell (who had a No. 2 Hot 100 hit with "Hit 'Em Up Style (Oops!)" in 2001), Combustible Edison, Sage Francis, Monty Are I, Draco and the Malfoys, and Billy Gillman. The pop music producer and songwriter Dr. Luke was born in Westerly.

== Other music ==
=== Portuguese music ===
Due to the large population of Portuguese immigrants in Southern New England, Portuguese traditional music is played in small communities. Usually Roman Catholic churches are the center of the communities activities, where music is played.

Fado, which has been compared with the Spanish flamenco, is a form of music characterized by mournful tunes and lyrics, often about the sea or the life of the poor, and infused with a characteristic sentiment of resignation, fatefulness, and melancholia (loosely captured by the word saudade, or "longing"). Fado performers play at local venues throughout Rhode Island and Southern Massachusetts.

The Azores is the major heritage of many Portuguese-Americans. In Rhode Island, most Portuguese traditional music is played by Azorean people. Azoreans maintain some distinct musical traditions, such as the traditionally fiddle-driven chamarrita dance. This dance and music is played mainly at weddings and Church festivals.

Azorean-Portuguese sensation Jorge Ferreira is a popular musician throughout New England, singing at many festivals and events.

=== Cape Verdean music ===
Of special importance is the music of the large Cape Verdean population. Although Cape Verdean music is largely unknown outside of the expatriate community, Rhode Island is the acknowledged center for Cape Verdean morna and other styles in the United States.

== Music festivals ==
=== Newport Jazz Festival ===
The Newport Jazz Festival began in 1954 by George Wein and has been documented on recordings by Miles Davis and Thelonious Monk, Duke Ellington, Muddy Waters, Nina Simone, Ray Charles, John Coltrane and Ella Fitzgerald and Billie Holiday. The 1958 festival was documented in the 1960 film Jazz on a Summer's Day. The festival moved to New York City in 1971. In 1985, the festival was revived in Newport as a JVC Jazz Festival.

=== Newport Folk Festival ===
The Newport Folk Festival began in 1959, co-founded by Jazz Festival founder George Wein. The festival is best known for the July 25, 1965 performance of Bob Dylan, where he performed for the first time with electric instruments. Like the Jazz Festival, the folk festival moved to New York City in 1971, but returned in 1986. Notable performers at the festivals included: Joan Baez, Phil Ochs, Bob Dylan, Buffalo Springfield, Pete Seeger, Arlo Guthrie, Richie Havens, Bonnie Raitt, Alison Krauss, Ry Cooder, Little Feat, Janis Ian, Suzanne Vega, Violent Femmes, The String Cheese Incident, Indigo Girls, and The Pixies.

=== Newport Music Festival ===
The Newport Music Festival is a classical music festival that began in 1969 as a summer season of the Metropolitan Opera. The outdoor venue was not conducive to classical music performance, and instead the grand rooms of the stately Newport mansions were put to use for chamber music concerts. The early concerts used many members of the Metropolitan Opera Orchestra. Mark P. Malkovich, III has been the general director for 31 of the 37 seasons. It has become known for giving young international artists, such as Inessa Galante, a venue for their American debut.

=== Sunset Music Festival ===
The Sunset Music Festival began in 1997 in Newport and has included performances by acts as varied as Saves the Day, Jason Mraz, Paula Cole, moe., Little Feat, Jack's Mannequin, Peter Frampton, Bo Bice, Bruce Hornsby, Guster, Something Corporate, Ben Folds (who has played at several festivals), Better Than Ezra, Cheap Trick, Gin Blossoms and Anna Nalick and also local artists like Becky Chace, Zox, and Monty Are I.

== List of popular musicians/bands from Rhode Island ==
- Amazing Royal Crowns
- Angry Salad
- AraabMuzik
- Arab on Radar
- Arc Iris
- Atwater-Donnelly
- Jon B.
- Badfish
- The Body
- Dicky Barrett
- Belly
- Black Dice (re-located to New York City)
- Blu Cantrell
- The Brother Kite
- Wendy Carlos
- George M. Cohan
- Combustible Edison
- Bill Conti
- The Cowsills
- Darkside (re-located to New York City)
- Daughters
- The Dear Hunter
- Deer Tick
- Downtown Boys
- Dropdead
- Ronnie Earl
- The Empire Shall Fall
- Face Dancer
- Fang Island
- Foxtrot Zulu
- Sage Francis
- Paul Geremia
- Billy Gilman
- Bobby Hackett
- Scott Hamilton
- Kristin Hersh
- Honeybunch
- John Cafferty and the Beaver Brown Band
- Les Savy Fav (re-located to New York City)
- Lightning Bolt
- The Low Anthem
- Kilgore
- M-80
- Monty Are I
- Neutral Nation
- Jeffrey Osborne
- The Others
- Duke Robillard
- Roomful of Blues
- Rubber Rodeo
- The Schemers
- Six Finger Satellite
- Carol Sloane
- Someday Providence
- Small Factory
- Space Needle
- Talking Heads (re-located to New York City)
- Tavares
- Throwing Muses
- Velvet Crush
- Verse
- Vital Remains
- What Cheer? Brigade
- The White Mice
- The Young Adults
- ZOX

== Bibliography ==
- Byron, Janet (1996). Country Music Lover's Guide to the U.S.A. (1st ed.). New York: St. Martin's Press. p. 178. ISBN 0-312-14300-1.
- Máximo, Susana & David Peterson (2000). "Music of Sweet Sorrow". In Broughton, Simon; Ellingham, Mark; McConnachie, James & Duane, Orla (eds.). World Music, Vol. 1: Africa, Europe and the Middle East. London: Rough Guides. pp. 448–457. ISBN 1-85828-636-0.
