= WBRU =

WBRU/WBRU360
- Providence, Rhode Island; United States
- Broadcast area: Providence, Rhode Island
- Frequency: Online only

Programming
- Format: WBRU: Modern rock; WBRU360: Urban contemporary

Ownership
- Owner: Brown Broadcasting Service, Inc.

History
- First air date: 1936 (as The Brown Network); February 21, 1966 (as an over-the-air station); September 1, 2017 (as internet-only station; January 7, 2018 (on 101.1 LPFM)
- Former frequencies: 95.5 MHz (1966–2017)
- Call sign meaning: Brown University

Links
- Webcast: WBRU/WBRU360 radio players
- Website: wbru.com

WBRU is an internet radio station based in Providence, Rhode Island. The station is owned and operated by Brown Broadcasting Service, an independent non-profit organization, and is primarily staffed by students from Brown University.

Formerly an FM modern rock radio station that broadcast at 95.5 FM in the Rhode Island area, WBRU currently broadcasts two online stations with different genres on each: indie and alternative on WBRU and an urban contemporary format on WBRU360, named after its long-time Sunday program, The 360° Experience in Sound. Since January 2018, WBRU's urban contemporary programming has been rebroadcast on Providence low-power FM station 101.1 FM, which is owned by another Brown University-affiliated group and has the call sign WBRU-LP.

WBRU has its origins in The Brown Network, which was founded in 1936 as one of the earliest amateur college radio broadcasters. By the time that the Brown Broadcasting Service organization was founded in 1962, radio broadcasting on the Brown University campus had turned from a hobbyist activity to a more serious enterprise. The organization purchased a commercial FM license in 1965 and aired its first broadcast on WBRU-FM on February 21, 1966. The station aired with a progressive rock format in the 1960s and 1970s, added new wave music into its playlist in the early 1980s, and switched to its current modern rock format in 1988. From 1966 to 2017, WBRU aired on the 95.5 FM frequency in the Providence market. In August 2017, Brown Broadcasting Service sold the 95.5 license to Educational Media Foundation and WBRU was replaced on that frequency by WLVO, a Christian adult contemporary station, at midnight on September 1, 2017. Although its primary alternative rock programming is no longer available on an over-the-air radio station, WBRU itself continues to be operated by BBS, and offers both its alternative rock and urban contemporary programming as an online-only programming provider.

== History ==
=== Beginnings ===
WBRU traces its origin to "The Brown Network", a low-power carrier current station that broadcast at 570 kHz on the AM band, and whose signal was limited to the Brown campus. (At this time, the two National Broadcasting Company (NBC) radio networks were known as the "Red Network" and the "Blue Network".) This first-ever carrier current station was established 1936 by George Abraham and David W. Borst. Abraham had originally installed an intercom system between his and Borst's dormitory rooms. The intercom links were first expanded to additional locations, and then replaced by distributed low-powered radio transmitters, which fed their signals into various buildings' electrical wires, allowing nearby radio receivers to receive the transmissions. Abraham originally conceived of the idea as a way to share his record collection and serve as a personal disk jockey for his friends. By the next year, he had installed wires through the trees on campus in order to connect to a number of buildings, assigning students in individual dormitories to act as "section managers" who would receive the signal and retransmit it throughout the rest of their building. After being recognized as an extra-curricular activity, The Brown Network was assigned a studio and control room located in the Faunce House student union building.

The New England Hurricane of 1938 destroyed most of the distribution wires, and Borst and Abraham were forced to move the wires into the steam tunnels beneath the campus. On November 3, 1939, David Sarnoff, the president of the Radio Corporation of America (whose son attended Brown) made a broadcast over The Brown Network. On February 17–18, 1940 an organizing convention for the Intercollegiate Broadcasting System (IBS) was held at Brown, attended by representatives from twelve colleges with existing or proposed carrier current stations. Abraham was elected the IBS Chairman, and Borst the Technical Manager. IBS's role was defined as a medium for the exchange of ideas and programs, in addition to working to attract national advertising contracts for the member stations. The first IBS intercollegiate broadcasts began on May 9, 1940, with a five-part series that was carried by stations located throughout New England at Brown, Harvard, Williams, and Wesleyan universities, in addition to the Universities of Connecticut and Rhode Island.

In 1945, student journalists began to use the WBRU call letters on air, which had been coined by undergraduate Stephen Plimpton.

=== The '60s and '70s ===
In 1962, the Brown Broadcasting Service (BBS) was established as a separate entity from the University and in 1965, the BBS purchased a commercial FM license (WPFM) from a company that was "bankrupt". WPFM was assigned from Golden Gate Corporation to BBS on April 9, 1965 for consideration of $30,000. BBS was then split into two stations: "WBRU-AM" and WBRU (FM). WBRU-AM, whose callsign was not FCC-assigned, continued to broadcast locally as a carrier current station (distributed through Brown's electrical system) and operated as the training station for WBRU, the FM station.

Brown Broadcasting Service began broadcasting over WBRU at the 95.5 frequency on February 21, 1966; The first program to be transmitted from the new station was a panel show which discussed the Peace Corps.

By the mid-'60s WBRU was considered an alternative station in that much of the music was folk and rock. Joni Mitchell, Richie Havens, Joan Baez had a home on this station and were not yet on mainstream radio. After 1966 much of the music format was not mainstream. The station was considered an "Underground Rock Music Station" similar to Boston's WBCN. The station's playlist featured artists such as Frank Zappa and The Mothers of Invention, The Fugs, Pearls Before Swine, Phil Ochs, Country Joe & The Fish and other left-leaning rock acts that were not typically played on mainstream radio.

During the 1970s, WBRU broadcast at 20,000 watts on 95.5 FM and established itself as the principal progressive rock (aka, album-oriented rock or AOR) station in Rhode Island and southern New England. Attempts to boost the signal to 50,000 watts with a transmitter on the Sciences Library failed because of the interference it caused to sensitive scientific equipment, but the station was making plans to move its transmitter to the WPRO-FM transmitter location and increase power to 50,000 watts. This could not be done until 2009 because public TV station WSBE-TV's analog TV antenna currently occupies the tower space where WBRU plans to put its broadcast antenna. WSBE is locating its digital antenna at the WJAR antenna tower in Rehoboth, Massachusetts.

=== Switch to alternative format ===
Logo used from the early 2000s until late 2009

In 1988, WBRU switched its format to modern rock and has remained in that format ever since, although leaning towards playing newer artists and artists of the indie rock genre.

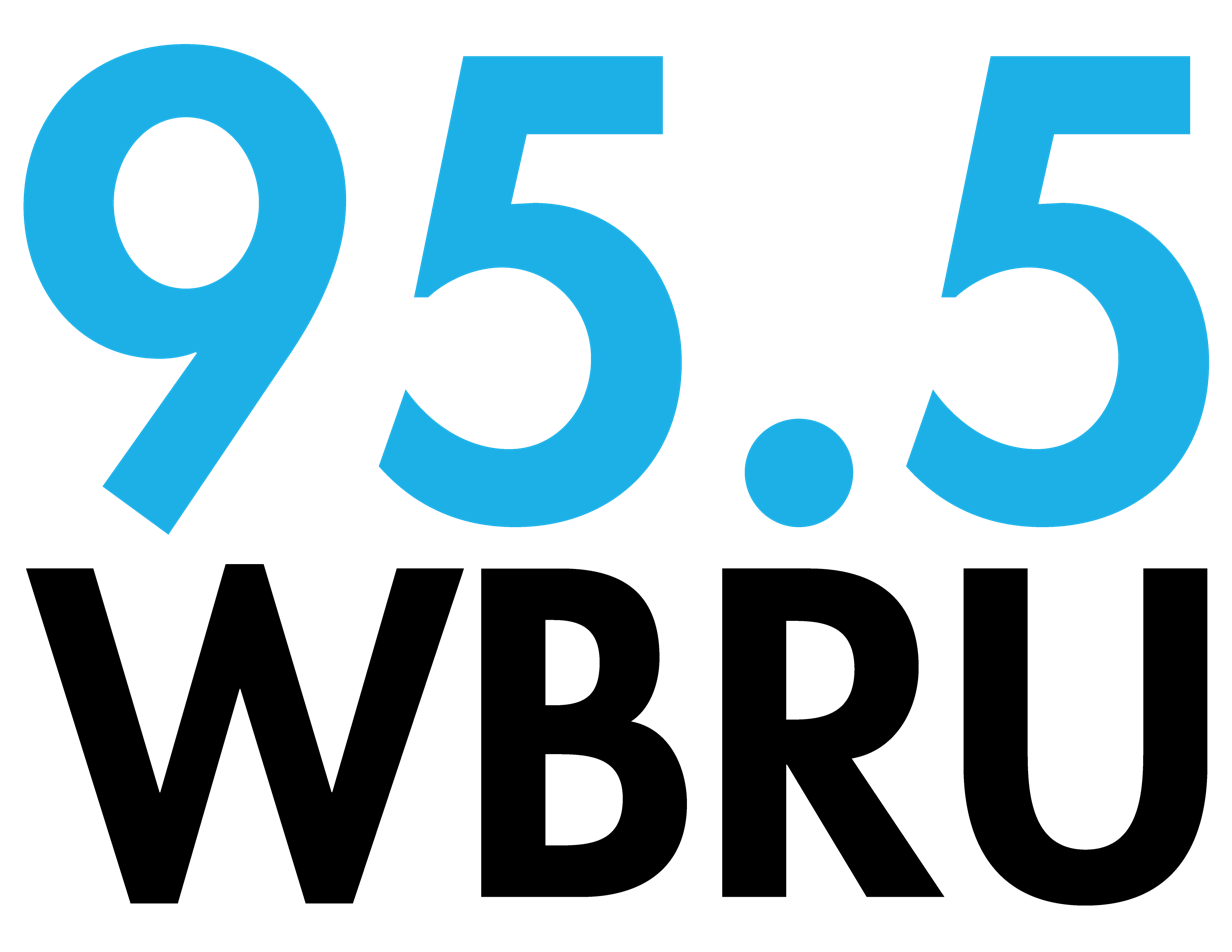
Logo used from the early 2010 through August 31, 2017

WBRU was also frequently named one of the best radio stations in the country by numerous trade magazines such as Billboard and Rolling Stone (which named it best radio station in the country in a medium size market three years in a row, the only radio station ever to achieve that).

The station is part of the Providence music scene, and has been instrumental in introducing to the area alternative bands such as Nirvana, Pearl Jam, and countless other important bands. It was among the first radio stations in the United States to play Ben Folds Five and Talking Heads. Kurt Cobain's last radio interview before his death was on WBRU.

Between April 17 and April 21, 2006, WBRU played their entire music catalog by title from A-Z, starting at 5:30 p.m. with "About a Girl" by Nirvana on the 17th and ending around 11:15 on the 21st with "Zombie" by The Cranberries. The songs ranged from new music (by such bands as Panic! at the Disco and Zox), 1980s and 1990s pop rarely played by the station (such as Right Said Fred's "I'm Too Sexy") and classic punk (i.e. Sex Pistols and New York Dolls).

On June 15, 2006, the station began streaming live online.

=== 2017 frequency sale and end of over-the-air broadcasting on 95.5 FM ===
In March 2017, the station's board of directors passed a resolution to begin seeking a buyer for the station, after 60 years of being owned and operated by the independent non-profit Brown Broadcasting Service organization. Many student members and alumni of the station were opposed to the resolution.

On August 25, 2017, it was announced that Brown Broadcasting Service had sold the 95.5 FM terrestrial frequency to Educational Media Foundation, a Christian music broadcaster, which planned to take over the frequency on September 1. The WBRU call letters and brand were not included as part of the sale, and Brown Student Radio applied to the FCC to transfer the call letters to its low-power radio station. In a statement on its website, WBRU announced that it would continue operations with two online radio stations, with 24/7 feeds for both its traditional modern rock format (WBRU) and its 360 Degree Experience in Sound hip hop and R&B program (WBRU360).

WBRU aired for the last time on 95.5 FM at 11:59 p.m. on August 31 and was replaced on that frequency by Educational Media Foundation's K-Love Christian adult contemporary network. The final song played on 95.5 WBRU before the changeover was "Fell in Love with a Girl" by The White Stripes, followed by a final sign-off by programing director DJ Chilbo. One minute later, at midnight on September 1, WBRU was relaunched as an online-only station, with the first song played being "Welcome To Paradise" by Green Day. Although the sale had not been completed by the time WBRU ceased broadcasting on 95.5FM, Educational Media Foundation opted to lease the frequency until the deal was approved.

In 2017, WBRU General Manager Kishanee Hathotuwegama said that the issues driving the sale were not primarily financial; FM radio was no longer was the way young people were listening to their music, an existential issue for a station staffed by volunteer college students. The sale was controversial, particularly with a contingent of older alumni. Hathotuwegama and the student leadership of the station sent a letter asking those alumni to stop trying to derail the sale and let the current and future students use the funds from the sale to take the workshop in a direction "that maintains the spirit that WBRU encompasses."

Brown University and its president, Christina Paxson, opposed the sale of the signal and license. In April 2017, Paxson e-mailed the station's board asking them to reconsider their plan and offered financial assistance to the station. In October, well after Brown Broadcasting Service had signed a purchase and sale agreement for the station, Paxson asked the board to consider an informal proposal from earlier in the year to sell the license to Rhode Island Public Radio instead.

The day of WBRU's final broadcast on FM radio, former student staff member Tucker Hamilton alleged that the sale of the station's license was coerced; Hamilton and other members of a WBRU alumni group asked Rhode Island attorney general Peter Kilmartin to block the sale to Educational Media Foundation. According to the attorney general's office, they met "with alumni and their attorney as a courtesy, but as our attorneys explained, Rhode Island statute and regulation does not give the attorney general any legal authority to intervene, as is the case in nearly all private sales." The Federal Communications Commission approved the sale of the 95.5 FM license to Educational Media Foundation on October 24, 2017. The transfer was finalized on November 4.

In January 2018, the WBRU callsign was transferred to a low-power Providence-based station located at 101.1 MHz and operated by the non-profit Brown Student and Community Radio group and the Providence arts and event space, AS220. The group and its station are not affiliated with the current WBRU online station or Brown Broadcasting Service, but they have made an arrangement with both to rebroadcast WBRU's urban contemporary online stream over the air. The low-power station continues to air WBRU programs on a permanent basis, including the 360° Experience in Sound on Sunday-Tuesday. The indie and alternative programming continues to run as a 24/7 online radio stream through the station's website and mobile app. Both the WBRU and WBRU360 stations are listed in most online radio directories, including TuneIn.

== Brown Student Radio (BSR) ==
In 1997, WBRU's carrier-current AM station split off and became Brown Student Radio (BSR), broadcasting initially on WELH/88.1, under a license owned by The Wheeler School and online . In 2003, BSR added a community radio element to its mission, incorporating community members as programmers and volunteers alongside students. In August 2011 BSR lost their air time on WELH and became an internet-only station. In January 2015, BSR was granted an FCC license for an LPFM station WPVD-LP on 101.1FM in Providence, in conjunction with Providence Community Radio and AS220. The Brown Student Radio station adopted the callsign WBRU-LP on September 1, 2017. The LPFM radio station went on the air on January 3, 2018.

=== Governance ===
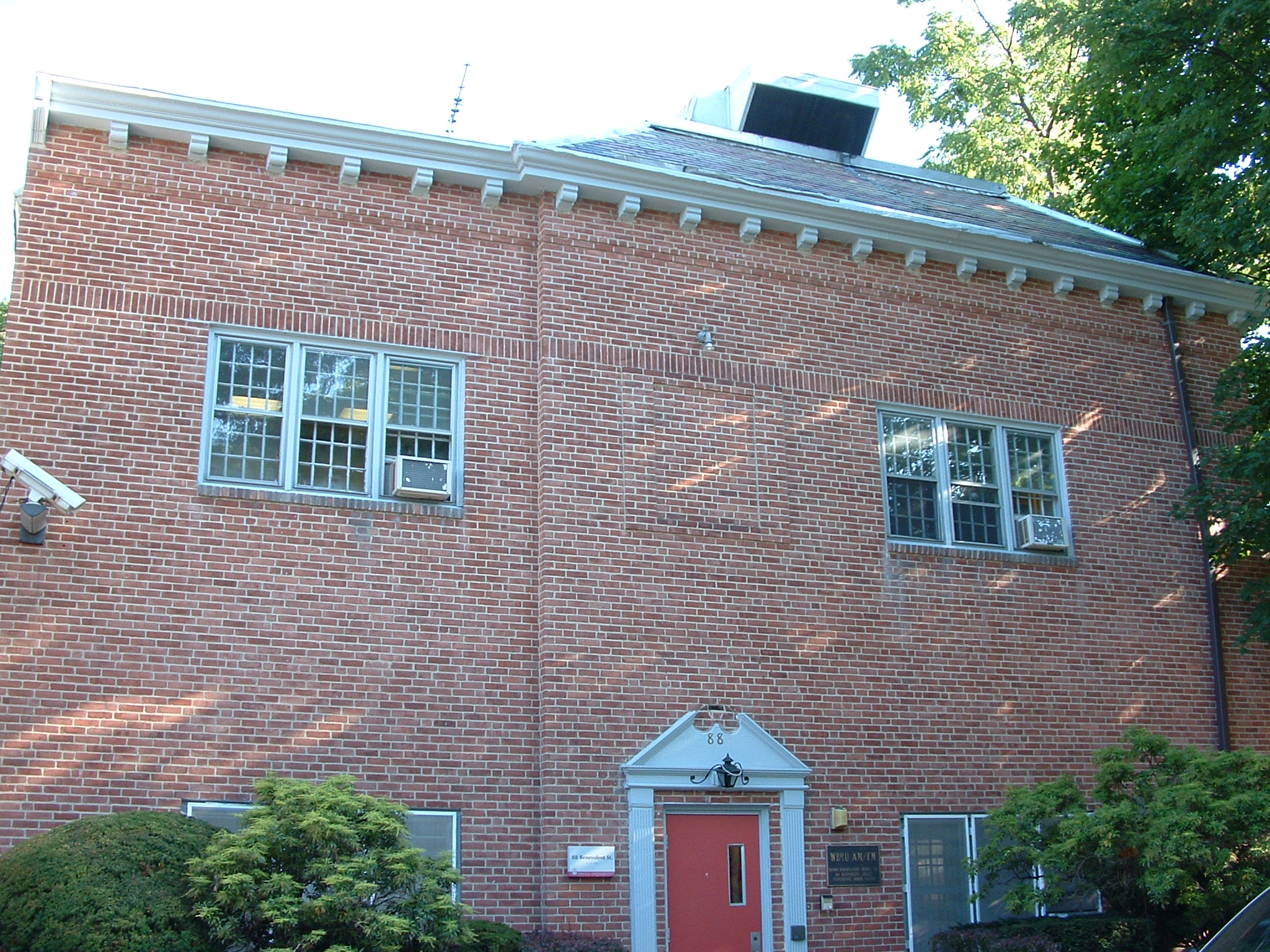
88 Benevolent St., the building from which WBRU broadcasts and is headquartered

95.5 WBRU was operated and run on a commercial basis. Its Program Director prior to the FM sale was Wendell Clough, who had been at the station for over a decade and was known by the on-air name "Wendell Gee", after the R.E.M. song of the same name. Its General Sales Manager was Jim Corwin, the former Vice President/Market Manager of Clear Channel Communications radio stations in Providence.

== Programming and formats ==
While an over-the-air station, WBRU aired a modern rock format six days a week, featuring alternative rock and other related genres, such as indie rock and punk rock. On Sundays, the station switched formats to hip hop and urban contemporary in a day-long program called The 360 Degree Experience in Sound. As an online-only station, WBRU now carries two separate, 24/7 feeds, one for each format.

=== Buddy FM prank ===
On March 29, 2006, WBRU claimed to be sold to Initech (a reference to the 1999 film Office Space) and changed the format of the station from alternative rock to "Buddy FM" - a variety hits format similar to the Jack format that had emerged at stations around the country. WBRU "signed off" on 4:57PM March 31, 2006, cutting out 10 seconds before the end of what they proclaimed to the final song played by the station, Good Riddance (Time of Your Life)" by Green Day and was replaced by dead air until 5:02PM, switching to "Buddy FM" with "The Sign" by Ace of Base. The hoax was complete with telling radio sweepers done in-studio. Some examples included: "Buddy FM: hits of the '70s '80s '90s and today... and the 1940s... and the 1850s...", and mentions that the station was "fun for the whole family" after which the station played "Me So Horny" by 2 Live Crew. Local network television affiliates WJAR and WLNE-TV reported that WBRU had been sold without gaining confirmation about the story.

It was later found out to be an April fools joke, and, as of noon on April 1, 2006, WBRU had "regained" control of their radio station and began playing their normal playlist once again. As the climax for the joke, Rich Lupo, the owner of Providence rock club Lupo's Heartbreak Hotel, claimed on air that he had "purchased" the station from "Initech" and given it back to the WBRU DJs. Later that day, the station's DJs confirmed that the entire stunt had been an elaborate April Fools' joke.

=== World premieres ===
In 2006, WBRU was the first U.S. radio station to play "Supermassive Black Hole" by British band Muse and played the Beck single "Cellphone's Dead" before its release until Interscope Records filed a cease and desist order against the station.

In 2007, WBRU premiered the Smashing Pumpkins new single "Tarantula" only 15 minutes after KROQ-FM world premiered it, becoming only the second station in the country to play it and the first to play it twice when they played it a second time immediately afterwards.

In 2008, WBRU was the first station in the country to air "I Will Possess Your Heart" by Death Cab For Cutie, which it did at approximately 1:30 p.m. on March 18, 2008.

In 2009, WBRU was the first station to debut Say Anything's new single "Hate Everyone." The single premiered at approximately 3:30 p.m. on August 17, 2009. The band's lead singer Max Bemis also premiered the song "Crush'd," playing acoustic in studio.

In 2013, WBRU was the first station to play Macklemore's "Thrift Shop" as reported by Billboard Magazine.

=== Timeline of notable events ===
- 1936 - First broadcast of the Brown Network
- 1940 - The newly formed Intercollegiate Broadcasting System holds its first meeting at Brown
- 1948 - The Outlet Company's WJAR-FM signs on 95.5 (May 10)
- 1950 - According to the 1950 Broadcasting Yearbook, WJAR-FM broadcasts at 20 kW
- 1953 - The FCC cancels the license for WJAR-FM at The Outlet Company's request (January 19)
- 1955 - Plantation Broadcasting Corporation is granted the license at 95.5 for WPFM (May 25)
- 1962 - Brown Broadcasting Service (BBS) is established as a corporation independent from Brown University
- 1963 - The first BBS/WBRU constitution is written
- 1965 - Brown Broadcasting Service, Inc. buys 95.5 WPFM for $30,000 and changes the call letters to WBRU
- 1966 - Brown Broadcasting Service begins broadcasting on 95.5 WBRU (February 21)
- 1969 - WBRU is the first progressive rock station in the market
- 1971 - Attempts to broadcast at 50,000 watts failed due to interference with sensitive scientific equipment
- 1974 - WBRU is granted tax-exempt status
- 1975 - First paid professionals are hired
- 1976 - Station receives first Gold Record for airplay of Bruce Springsteen's "Born to Run."
- 1979 - WBRU moves its studio from Faunce House to 88 Benevolent Street, its current location
- 1981 - Competitor 94.1 WHJY signs on (October)
- 1982 - Due to low ratings, WBRU abandons its free-form format and hires the consulting firm of Burkhart, Abrams, Michaels, Douglas & Associates to "develop a new AOR approach"
- 1984 - Elvis Costello stops by with a box of records and plays DJ for an hour
- 1985 - WBRU is the first radio station shouted-out in Fishbone's single "? (Modern Industry)"
- 1988 - WBRU adopts a modern-rock format, called "The Cutting Edge of Rock" (September)
- 1992 - Student station members reverse a decision which would turn WBRU into an NPR affiliate
- 1993 - WBRU wins first place in the Rolling Stone Readers' Poll for best radio station in the medium-sized market category
- 1994 - WBRU wins first place again in the Rolling Stone Readers' Poll
- 1995 - 99.7 WDGE signs on and becomes a direct competitor with WBRU (June)
- 1995 - WBRU wins first place again in the Rolling Stone Readers' Poll
- 1999 - 99.7 WDGE officially signs off (due to WBRU's dominance in the market) and is replaced by WHKK
- 1999 - Station members vote unanimously against a joint sales agreement with Capstar Broadcasting Company
- 2000 - WFNX, a Boston station, extends into Providence to compete with WBRU on 103.7 (then WWRX)
- 2002 - 100.3 WZRI becomes rock WKKB (October 31)
- 2004 - 103.7 WWRX/WFNX signs off in Providence
- 2005 - 100.3 WKKB becomes a Spanish station (February 1)
- 2006 - As a three-day April Fools' Day hoax, WBRU pretends to be bought-out by "Initech" who change the station's format to "Buddy FM"
- 2006 - On June 15, WBRU begins to stream live on the web
- 2006 - The station plays its entire catalog from A-Z
- 2007 - As its annual April Fools' Joke, the station was stuck in a time warp - 1995; and all music played was recorded before the date.
- 2008 - Station plays its entire catalog from A-Z again.
- 2008 - Red Sox games air live on WBRU when WEEI broadcasts Boston Celtics playoff games instead
- 2017 - Brown Broadcasting Service sells the 95.5 FM frequency, WBRU becomes an online-only station (September 1)
- 2018 - 101.1 WBRU-LP signs on (January 3)

== Concert Promotion ==
=== WBRU Annual Rock Hunt ===
The radio station holds a battle of the bands, the WBRU Annual Rock Hunt, which began around 1980 and was held most years since:

==== Past Winners of the WBRU Annual Rock Hunt ====
- 1980: The DC Tenz
- 1981: The Mundanes (featuring band member John Linnell, later of They Might Be Giants)
- 1982: The Schemers
- 1983: Critical Few
- 1984: no competition
- 1985: MX
- 1986: The Dames (featuring band member Gail Greenwood, later of Belly and L7)
- 1987: Coat of Arms
- 1988: That'll Learn Ya
- 1989: Bop Harvey
- 1990: Jungle Dogs
- 1991: Superbug
- 1992: The Phobics
- 1993: Angry Salad
- 1994: John Monopoly
- 1995: Blairs Carriage
- 1996: Comic Book Super Heroes
- 1997: The Agents
- 1998: The L.U.V's
- 1999: no competition
- 2000: no competition
- 2001: no competition
- 2002: M-80
- 2003: Zox
- 2004: The Lingo
- 2005: Sasquatch and the Sick-A-Billys
- 2006: The Sleazies
- 2007: Triangle Forest
- 2008: It Was The Best Of Times
- 2009: Fairhaven
- 2010: The Wandas
- 2011: VulGarrity
- 2012: Roz Raskin and the Rice Cakes
- 2013: Torn Shorts
- 2014: The Rare Occasions
- 2015: Public Alley
- 2016: Le Roxy Pro
- 2017: Call Security
- 2018: no competition

=== WBRU Summer Concert Series ===
Every summer the station puts on the WBRU concert series. The shows usually feature a popular band and a few local acts opening up. Initially, there were about 10 shows per year which were free to the public and paid for by sponsor booths, but in recent years the station has started charging for these concerts and has reduced the number of shows to 3 per year. In 2010, the station resumed free single artist Summer Concert Series concerts in addition to the multiple band for-pay concerts. Past concert series include:

- 1996: The Cardigans
- 1997: Our Lady Peace; Echo & the Bunnymen; The Seahorses
- 1998: Candlebox and Fastball; Black Lab, Athenaeum, and Emmet Swimming Soul Asylum; Save Ferris and Grüvis Malt; Big Bad Voodoo Daddy
- 1999: Silverchair and Dovetail Joint; The Flys and Fountains of Wayne; The Verve Pipe; Sponge; Beth Orton; Fuel and Vertical Horizon
- 2000: Guster; Eve 6 and SR-71; Vertical Horizon and 3 Doors Down; Catherine Wheel, Wheatus and Amazing Crowns; The Mighty Mighty Bosstones and Sum 41; Everclear; Silverchair; Caviar
- 2001: Grüvis Malt and Poe; Better Than Ezra; Rustic Overtones and Bob's Day Off; Stroke 9 and Turning Blue
- 2002: New Found Glory and Goldfinger; Better Than Ezra and Maroon 5; Custom and Grüvis Malt; Pete Yorn and Sense Field (moved indoors to Lupo's due to rain); Trik Turner; Ash and Unwritten Law (moved indoors to Lupo's due to rain); Doves
- 2003: Guster and ZOX; Third Eye Blind and Hot Hot Heat; Brand New and M-80
- 2004: Lit, Local H and Finger Eleven; New Found Glory, The Living End and The Lingo; Lostprophets, Midtown and Monty's Fan Club
- 2005: The Bravery and Hot Hot Heat; Finch, ZOX and the Rx Bandits; My Chemical Romance, Alkaline Trio, and Monty Are I
- 2006: Guster and Blizzard of '78; Hawthorne Heights and Yellowcard; Dropkick Murphys, Madball and The Sleazies
- 2007: Plain White T's, The Academy Is... and Arcadia Landing; The Bravery, Shiny Toy Guns and Triangle Forest; Guster and Hello Mahalo
- 2008: Death Cab for Cutie and Amanda Palmer; ZOX, Badfish, Someday Providence, Hello Mahalo and Scotty Don't; Paramore, Jack's Mannequin, Phantom Planet and Paper Route; Ben Folds and Missy Higgins
- 2009: Third Eye Blind and Wild Light; The Airborne Toxic Event, Metric, Cage the Elephant and The Nightwatchman; The Mighty Mighty Bosstones, Ida Maria and Catch-22
- 2010: AFI, Violent Soho and New Politics; Fanfarlo; Civil Twilight; Sit Down Baby; Fairhaven; Constellations; Santa Mamba; The Wandas (canceled); Sarah Potenza and the Tall Boys; OK Go; Coheed and Cambria, The Dear Hunter and Manchester Orchestra
- 2011: Santa Mamba, Young the Giant, Deer Tick, Sleeper Agent, Viva Brother, VulGarity, The Wandas
- 2012: Grouplove, Delta Spirit, White Rabbits, Walk the Moon, The Tower and the Fool, The Silks, The Rice Cakes
- 2013: New Politics, Torn Shorts, The 1975, The Neighbourhood, The Mowgli's, Cold War Kids
- 2014: Phantogram and The Brother Kite; The Rare Occasions and Torn Shorts; Magic Man and The Complaints; Max Frost and Roz Raskin and The Rice Cakes; Kongos and Satellites Fall; Sleeper Agent and The Americans
- 2015: Joywave and Jetty; Public Alley and S. Walcott; Saint Motel and We Were Astronauts; In the Valley Below and The Rare Occasions; Andrew McMahon the Wilderness and Forest Fires; Life in Film and Le Roxy Pro
- 2016: Ra Ra Riot and The Heavy with VulGarrity, 2016 WBRU Rock Hunt winners Le Roxy Pro with Weezer tribute act The Blue Album, Mainland with Eric and the Nothing, Lucius with Math the Band, AURORA with Young Lincoln, Nothing but Thieves with Tall Teenagers, The Wombats with Wild Sun.
- 2017: The Unlikely Candidates with Cannibal Runners, DREAMERS with The Beardogz, Marian Hill with Call Security, SWMRS with Neural Nation.
- 2018: Senior Discount, Khary, Stuyedeyed, Flawless Real Talk, Tomi, Quentin Miller.

=== WBRU Birthday Bash ===
The station also has their Birthday Bash concerts in November to celebrate the station's anniversary. Although 95.5 WBRU first aired in February 1966 and Birthday Bash concerts are promoted with an anniversary date that dates to that year (i.e. 2016 as the station's 50th anniversary), the November date instead celebrates the first broadcasts made on its Brown Network ancestor in November 1936. From 2007 to 2010, the Birthday Bash was split from one concert to multiple concerts throughout November. Previously, the only time it was split was in 2001 where two concerts were held. Past Birthday bashes include:

- 1994: Stabbing Westward, Hole, Weezer and Sheryl Crow
- 1995: Lisa Loeb, Ben Folds Five and Everclear
- 1996: Superdrag, Republica, Soul Coughing, Local H, Luscious Jackson, G. Love and Special Sauce, The Lemonheads, Goldfinger and Fun Lovin' Criminals
- 1997: Letters to Cleo, Ben Folds Five, Catherine Wheel, Everclear, Sneaker Pimps, Days of the New, Blink-182 and Ben Harper
- 1998: Placebo, Cracker, Local H, Everlast, Marcy Playground, Big Bad Voodoo Daddy, Godsmack and Eels
- 1999: G. Love and Special Sauce, Vertical Horizon, Guster, Primus, Our Lady Peace, Foo Fighters, Run-DMC, Staind, Kid Rock, Tori Amos and Marcy Playground
- 2000: Orgy, Disturbed, Dexter Freebish, VAST, Linkin Park and Collective Soul
- 2001: Tantric, 311, Adema and Lit; Coldplay, Remy Zero and Delta Clutch
- 2002: SR-71, Ash, Ok Go and Box Car Racer
- 2003: The Crystal Method, Rancid, Something Corporate, Yellowcard, Brand New, Kill Hannah, Story of the Year and Three Days Grace
- 2004: Skindred, Papa Roach, The Used, Taking Back Sunday, Lit, Coheed and Cambria, M-80 and Presidents of the United States of America
- 2005: Zox, Story of the Year, Thirty Seconds to Mars, Morningwood and Sasquatch and the Sick-a-Billys
- 2006: My Chemical Romance and Say Anything
- 2007: Avenged Sevenfold and Operator; Papa Roach and 10 Years; Against Me! and Sage Francis; Silversun Pickups, Triangle Forest and Steel Train; Cake and Detroit Cobras
- 2008: Shiny Toy Guns; Girl Talk and Senior Discount; Mindless Self Indulgence and Leathermouth
- 2009: Passion Pit; Monty Are I; AFI and Gallows; Silversun Pickups and Cage the Elephant
- 2010: Guster and Jukebox the Ghost; The Wandas; Neutral Nation; Motion City Soundtrack, Say Anything and Saves the Day; Matt & Kim and Javelin
- 2011: Matt & Kim, Young the Giant and The Naked and Famous
- 2012: Passion Pit, The Joy Formidable, Ra Ra Riot and The Rice Cakes
- 2013: The Neighbourhood, The Mowgli's, IAMDYNAMITE, Young the Giant, Torn Shorts and The Colourist
- 2014: Dirty Heads, Rome Ramirez, Knox Hamilton and The Rare Occasions
- 2015: Cold War Kids, BØRNS, Coleman Hell and Public Alley
- 2016: Nathaniel Rateliff & The Nightsweats, Weathers and Le Roxy Pro
- 2017: no concert

== News department ==
WBRU has a full news department, with sports news and entertainment news divisions. For 2007, they won the Massachusetts/Rhode Island Associated Press awards in the college division for Best Web Site, Best Investigative Reporting, Best Breaking News, Best Feature Reporting, Best Continuing Coverage, Best Sports Program, and Best Use of Sound, and the award for News Station of the Year.

== Notable alumni ==
WBRU staff members have gone on to excel in a variety of areas. They include:

- Christiane Amanpour, CNN Foreign Correspondent
- Ralph Begleiter, former CNN correspondent and Distinguished Journalist in Residence, University of Delaware
- Chris Berman, anchor, ESPN and ABC Sports
- Lisa Birnbach, author, best known for editing The Official Preppy Handbook
- Karyn Bryant, former MTV VJ, television personality, actress
- Andy Fisher, president of Cox Television
- Al Gomes, record producer, music industry strategist, historian, and songwriter
- Ben Harvey, President of Palm Tree Records, former TV and radio host, Here! (TV network), SiriusXM, and WXRK, New York City
- Jonathan Klein, president, CNN/U.S.
- Bill Lichtenstein, Peabody Award-winning journalist, filmmaker and president, Lichtenstein Creative Media
- Dan Maffei, United States Representative for New York's 24th congressional district
- Ben Knox Miller and Jeffrey Prystowsky, who met while hosting the station's late night jazz program and subsequently formed the folk group The Low Anthem
- Eric Nadel, sports announcer
- Felice Schachter, actress and producer
- Aaron Schatz, ESPN.com NFL analyst and founder of Football Outsiders
- Rachel Smolkin, Deputy Managing Editor of POLITICO
- Jane Spencer, Pulitzer Prize-winning journalist, Wall Street Journal
- Alison Stewart, host, All of It with Alison Stewart on WNYC, New York City
- Dick Wingate, former SVP A&R PolyGram Records, SVP Marketing Arista Records, SVP Content & Programming Liquid Audio, Chief Content Officer, Nellymoser, Inc.

== Stations ==
Call sign	Frequency	City of license	FID	ERP (W)	HAAT	Class	FCC info
WBRU-LP	101.1 FM	Providence, Rhode Island	196244	100	25.32 m (83 ft)	L1	LMS

== Notes ==
1. Mitchell, Martha. (2003). "WBRU." Encyclopedia Brunoniana.
2. Schwartzapfel, Beth. (January/February 2006). "Radio Heads." Brown Alumni Magazine.
