= Auburn High School (Massachusetts) =

Public school in Massachusetts, US

Coordinates: 42.2084°N 71.837°W

Auburn Senior High School
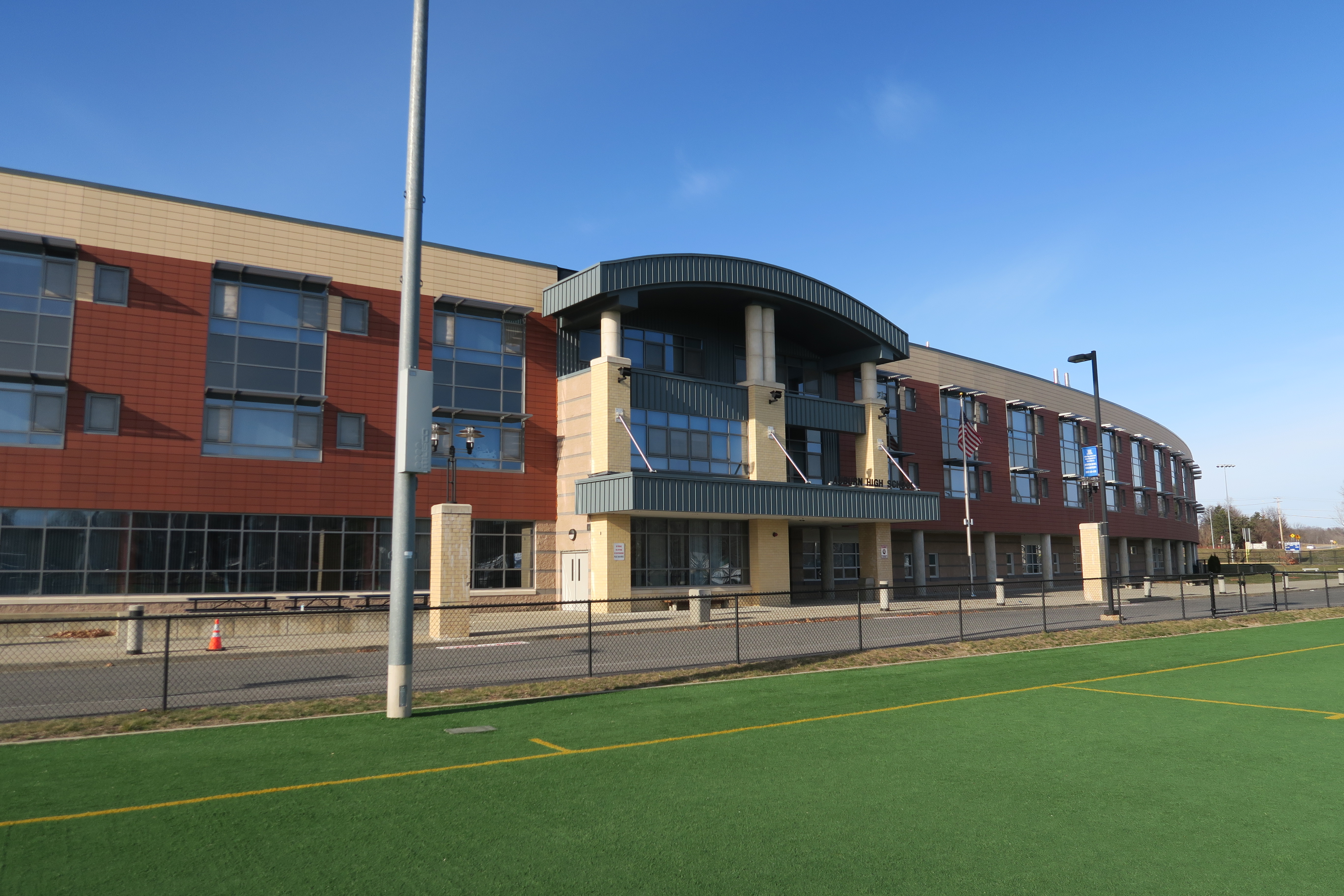
- Auburn High School

Location
- 99 Auburn Street; Auburn, Worcester County, MA 01501; United States

Information
- School type: Public; Open enrollment
- Motto: Go Rockets
- Established: 1935, rebuilt in 2006
- School district: Auburn Public Schools
- Principal: Daniel Delongchamp
- Teaching staff: 65.02 (FTE)
- Grades: PK, 9-12
- Enrollment: 815 (2023–2024)
- Student to teacher ratio: 12.53
- Colors: Blue and white
- Athletics conference: Central Massachusetts Athletic Conference
- Nickname: Rockets 1992-present Dandies 1935-1992
- Rival: Oxford High School (Massachusetts)
- Accreditation: NEASC
- Affiliations: Auburn Public Schools
- Website: https://www.auburn.k12.ma.us/schools/auburn-high-school/index

Auburn High School is the only public high school in Auburn, Massachusetts, United States, a town approximately five miles south of Worcester. It had an enrollment of 815 students in grades 9-12 and 96 preschool attendees, as of the 2023–2024 school year. Founded in 1935, the original school building served the town until the spring of 2006. In August 2006, the town of Auburn opened a new facility directly behind the original building.

== Stadium ==
Auburn High School's sports venue is called Auburn Memorial Field. Built in August 2006, the centerpiece is a lighted, 1000-seat FieldTurf stadium surrounded by a six-lane track. The stadium is used for AHS football, AHS soccer (boys' and girls') and AHS track and field (boys' and girls'). The stadium has two long jump runways and sand pits for track and field, as well as a pole vault and high jump area.

There is also a lighted FieldTurf facility dedicated for AHS field hockey. New baseball and softball fields have also been built on the grounds, with the softball field being on the site of the old high school.

== Academics ==
For the last 10 years Auburn High School's Advanced Placement United States Government & Politics class has competed in the "We the People" State Competition. Mr. Kennard and Mr. Benacchio run the team, which consists of students from the AP Government and Politics class. Each January, the competition is held at the Edward M. Kennedy Institute. The competition simulates congressional hearings in which Auburn students compete against schools from all over Massachusetts. Topics include philosophers, the founding of America, and how the Constitution affects citizens' day-to-day lives. The We the People team finished second place in the state competition.

Auburn was named the 2014 and 2015 Massachusetts We the People State champions. As state champions, Auburn High School represented Massachusetts at the national level in Washington, D.C. The team raised over $50,000 each year in order to get to Washington D.C., most of which came from the local Auburn community. In 2016 and 2017, Auburn finished third in the state. In 2018, Auburn finished second, and was named a State Wild Card for the 2018 National Competition.

== Notable alumni ==
- Tyler Beede, baseball pitcher for the San Francisco Giants
- Barbara Marois, member of US Women's field hockey team that finished 5th at the 1996 Summer Olympics
- Keith McEachern, lead singer and guitarist for the WANDAS
