= The Wandas (album) =

Studio album by the Wandas
- Released: August 30, 2011
- Recorded: December 2010
- Genre: Rock
- Length: 48:10
- Producer: Patrick Krief

The Wandas chronology
New Wave Blues (2009)	The Wandas (2011)	New Interface (a design with friends for the future) (2013)

Professional ratings
Review scores
Source	Rating
American Songwriter	4/5 stars

The Wandas is the second studio album by the Wandas, independently released in conjunction with the band's publishing company, TFMRA, LLC in 2011. It was featured in USA TODAY, American Songwriter,Paste Magazine and Spinner. The album was named one of the "50 best albums of the first half of 2011" by Guitar World Magazine.

== Track listing ==
1. "Do or Die" – 3:56 McEachern / Battey
2. "Forever and Ever" – 4:02 McEachern / Battey
3. "Tied a Knot" – 3:45 McEachern
4. "Mr. Mister" – 2:50 McEachern
5. "Loaded" - 4:36 McEachern
6. "Shotguns and Booze" – 2:32 McEachern
7. "I Think it's Time (you got over yourself)" – 3:42 McEachern / Bierce
8. "Feel It." – 3:16 McEachern
9. "Longtime Running" – 4:22 Battey / McEachern
10. "Abandon Ship" – 6:38 Battey
11. "Everything Has Changed – 3:10 McEachern

== Personnel ==
The Wandas

- Keith McEachern - Lead vocals, electric and acoustic guitar, synth, keys, piano, b3 organ, glockenspiel, percussion
- Brent Battey - Electric guitar, background vocals, lead vocals on "Abandon Ship"
- Ross Lucivero - Bass guitar, additional guitar on I Think it's Time (you got over yourself)
- William Bierce - Drums, percussion, background vocals, additional piano on Forever and Ever
- Liam O'Neil - Wurlitzer, tenor saxophone
- Chris Seligman - French Horn

Technical

- Patrick Krief - Producer, additional guitars on Abandon Ship, Cowbell on Feel It.
- Dave Schiffman - Mixer
- J. Saliba - Engineer
- Ryan Morey - Mastering
