= Star (Belly album) =

Studio album by Belly
- Released: January 25, 1993 (UK); February 2, 1993 (US)
- Studios: Sound Emporium (Nashville, Tennessee); Amazon (Liverpool, England)
- Genres: Alternative rock; dream pop; avant-rock; folk rock; jangle pop; post-punk; avant-pop
- Length: 50:53
- Labels: Sire; Reprise (North America) 4AD (rest of world)
- Producers: Belly; Tracy Chisolm; Gil Norton

Belly chronology
Star (1993)	King (1995)

Singles from Star
- 1. "Gepetto" Released: November 9, 1992; 2. "Feed the Tree" Released: January 11, 1993; 3. "Full Moon, Empty Heart" Released: 1993; 4. "Slow Dog" Released: 1993

Star is the debut studio album by American alternative rock band Belly, released on January 25, 1993.

== Background ==
In the 1980s and 1990s, vocalist and guitarist Tanya Donelly performed with Throwing Muses and the Breeders. After recording the latter's Safari EP in 1992, she decided to quit both bands to solely focus on her own band, Belly. Belly formed at the end of the previous year, consisting of Donelly, guitarist Thomas Gorman, bassist Fred Abong and drummer Chris Gorman. They released their debut EP Slow Dust in June 1992, produced by Gil Norton, and followed it up with the Gepetto EP in November.

== Composition ==
Along with alternative rock and jangle pop, the songs on Star also dig into "haunting", "avant" folk rock. Tanya Donelly was credited with pushing dream pop's boundaries by "trimming away its pretensions" while keeping its "trancy harmonies". A "distinct post-punk quality" has also been seen in the music, alongside some country and spaghetti Western influences.

"Angel" is not a rerecording of the song of the same name that Tanya Donelly wrote with Throwing Muses for their 1989 album Hunkpapa.

== Release ==
Star was released on January 25, 1993, and was an unexpected success. Abong departed from the group in May 1993, his role being filled by Gail Greenwood. On February 21, 1994, the album was certified Gold by the Recording Industry Association of America for sales of at least 500,000 units.

The single "Feed the Tree" topped the Billboard Modern Rock Tracks chart in March 1993, and also became a surprise pop hit, peaking at number 95 on the Billboard Hot 100 singles chart. The music video for "Feed the Tree" received notable airplay on MTV, culminating in two nominations at the 1993 MTV Video Music Awards for Best New Artist in a Video and Best Alternative Video. "Slow Dog" peaked at number 17 on the Modern Rock Tracks chart in May 1993, while "Gepetto" peaked at number eight in November, in addition to reaching number 13 on the Billboard Bubbling Under the Hot 100 chart.

== Reception ==
Professional ratings
Review scores
Source	Rating
AllMusic	4.5/5 stars
Chicago Tribune	3/4 stars
Entertainment Weekly	B
Mojo	4/5 stars
NME	8/10
Q	4/5 stars
Record Collector	4/5 stars
Rolling Stone	4/5 stars
Slant Magazine	4.5/5 stars
Spin Alternative Record Guide	6/10

NME reviewer John Harris wrote that Star "finds Tanya Donelly venting the pop sensibilities that were occasionally allowed to surface during her time with Throwing Muses", praising it as "a rare thing; a pop album that's streaked with themes that are usually the preserve of art-rock bores." Q's Mark Cooper raved that Donelly shows a "newfound confidence" and demonstrates "her ability to blend pop drive with the Muses' moody atmospherics and labelmates like the Cocteau Twins." In Melody Maker, Jim Irvin found that as a whole, the album shows "a depth and variety only hinted at" by its singles, which he felt sounded more effective "when heard in proximity to the darker material." Kevin Ransom of Rolling Stone said that Donelly's "free-verse lyrics and metaphorical overreach" suggested the influence of Bob Dylan, which Ransom welcomed as "a very good sign" at a time "when too many alternative-rock bands worship at the Church of Perpetual Grunge and Dissonance". Los Angeles Times journalist Chris Tinkham commented that Donelly "deliver[s] her haunted blues and surreal rock with assurance and adventure."

Stephanie Zacharek was more reserved in her praise in Entertainment Weekly, complimenting the music on Star while finding Donelly's lyrics awkward at times. Orlando Sentinel critic Parry Gettelman, however, wrote that Donelly often "lapses into that current bane of college rock, the baby-girl voice, sounding like a cross between Julianna Hatfield [sic] and Marilyn Monroe."

In 1994, Star was nominated for a Grammy Award for Best Alternative Album, while Belly were nominated for Best New Artist. The band won Best Modern Rock Act at the Boston Music Awards, with Star winning the Debut Album of the Year award. In a retrospective review for AllMusic, Stephen Thomas Erlewine said that the album "remains an enchanting debut" and marked the point where Donelly's songwriting, which "began to blossom" on Throwing Muses' The Real Ramona (1991), "reaches fruition." Slant Magazine's Sal Cinquemani praised its "marriage of mainstream sensibilities and alt-rock aesthetic", which he found "makes Star transcend the grunge-rock label and, years later, continue to shine so brightly." In Mojo, Martin Aston highlighted the album's "classic pop tropes", which he noted would not have befitted the "anxious energy" of Throwing Muses, and which allowed Star to achieve "alt-rock crossover" success. Tim Peacock of Record Collector wrote that Star "is still Belly's most necessary platter" and endures as "a fetching concoction of dreamy, folk-tinged alt. rock ... long on concise, hooky songs".

== Track listing ==
All tracks are written by Tanya Donelly, except where noted.

No.	Title	Writer(s)	Length
1.	"Someone to Die For"		2:04
2.	"Angel"		2:58
3.	"Dusted"		2:48
4.	"Every Word"		3:33
5.	"Gepetto"		3:24
6.	"Witch"		1:35
7.	"Slow Dog"		4:02
8.	"Low Red Moon"		5:32
9.	"Feed the Tree"		3:29
10.	"Full Moon, Empty Heart"		3:02
11.	"White Belly"	Donelly; Fred Abong	3:36
12.	"Untogether"		4:43
13.	"Star"		1:27
14.	"Sad Dress"		3:44
15.	"Stay"		4:56
Total length:			50:53

== Personnel ==
Adapted from AllMusic's Credits page for Star.

Belly

- Tanya Donelly – vocals, guitar
- Fred Abong – bass
- Chris Gorman – drums, percussion
- Thomas Gorman – guitar, organ

Additional musicians

- Chick Graining – guitar, slide guitar, vocals

Technical

- Belly – production
- Tracy Chisholm – engineering, production
- Gil Norton – production

Artwork and design

- Chris Bigg – design
- Chris Gorman – photography

== Charts ==
Chart performance for Star
Chart (1993)	Peak position
Australian Albums (ARIA)	74
Dutch Albums (Album Top 100)	65
UK Albums (Official Charts)	2
US Billboard 200	59
US Heatseekers Albums (Billboard)	1

== Certifications ==
Certifications for Star
Region	Certification	Certified units/sales
United Kingdom (BPI)	Silver	60,000^{^}
United States (RIAA)	Gold	500,000^{^}
^{^} Shipments figures based on certification alone.
