= New Interface (A Design with Friends for the Future) =

New Interface (a design with friends for the future)

Studio album by the Wandas
- Released: June 25, 2013
- Recorded: May 2012
- Genre: Surf rock, psychedelic rock
- Length: 33:38
- Producer: Joel Ford

The Wandas chronology
The Wandas (2011)	New Interface (a design with friends for the future) (2013)

New Interface (a design with friends for the future) is the third studio album by the Wandas, independently released in conjunction with the band's publishing company, TFMRA, LLC in 2013.

== Track listing ==
1. "New Interface" – 3:55 McEachern / Battey / Lucivero
2. "Davy Jones' Locher" – 3:07 Battey
3. "Mad Man" – 3:01 McEachern
4. "Good Feeling" – 3:49 Battey
5. "Killer Heart" - 4:14 McEachern
6. "Velvet Dream" – 2:38 McEachern
7. "American Land" – 3:18 Battey
8. "How I'm Doing" – 3:44 McEachern
9. "Hood River Blues" – 2:56 McEachern / Battey / Lucivero
10. "My Mourning" – 2:56 Battey

== Personnel ==
The Wandas

- Keith McEachern – Lead vocals, guitar, synth, keyboards, glockenspiel, percussion
- Brent Battey – Lead vocals, guitar, keyboards
- Ross Lucivero – Bass guitar, gang vocal
- Greg Settino – Drums, percussion, gang vocal
- Joel Ford – Producer, synthesizer, harmonies

Technical

- Patrick Krief – Mixer
- J. Saliba – Engineer
- Ryan Morey – Mastering
