= Le Roxy Pro =

American rock band

Le Roxy Pro is a Neo surf rock band. Formed in August 2014 by Lead Singer Brent Battey formally of the Band The Wandas, alongside bandmates Greg Settino, Sam Creager, Dave Chapman, and Andrew Knox. They are based in both Boston, Massachusetts and Providence, Rhode Island.

The band has performed throughout New England and have opened for Life in Film as well as Nate Rateliff and the Night Sweats. Their self titled Album came out in 2014, was mixed by guitarist Patrick Krief of the band The Dears, and mastered by Ryan Morey (Arcade Fire, Wolf Parade and The Stills). As a solo artist, Brent has been a past winner of the WBRU Rock Hunt as well as making it to the National Finals at the Emergenza festival. The band was the winner of the 2016 Rock Hunt.
