= 1993 MTV Video Music Awards =

Award ceremony

- Date: Thursday, September 2, 1993
- Location: Universal Amphitheatre, Los Angeles, California
- Country: United States
- Hosted by: Christian Slater
- Most awards: Pearl Jam (4)
- Most nominations: En Vogue (8)

Television/radio coverage
- Network: MTV
- Produced by: Doug Herzog; Judy McGrath
- Directed by: David Grossman

The 1993 MTV Video Music Awards aired live on September 2, 1993, honoring the best music videos from June 16, 1992, to June 15, 1993. The show was hosted by Christian Slater at the Universal Amphitheatre in Los Angeles. This would be Kurt Cobain's final VMA appearance.

This year marked the introduction of yet another new category with the addition of Best R&B Video ballot. However, this would be the first time that a new award was added to the list of genre categories, a move that was mainly propelled by the success and popularity of MTV Jams.

The night's biggest winner was Pearl Jam, whose video for "Jeremy" earned four awards that night, including Video of the Year. Closely following were En Vogue with three Moonmen and Madonna and Peter Gabriel with two awards apiece. All other winners took one award each.

Meanwhile, in terms of nominations R&B group En Vogue and their video for "Free Your Mind" were the most nominated act and video (respectively) that night, receiving a total of eight nominations. The second most nominated artists of the night were Peter Gabriel, Aerosmith, and R.E.M., who received six nominations each. Gabriel split his six nominations evenly between his videos for "Digging in the Dirt" and "Steam," while all of R.E.M.'s nominations went to their video for "Man on the Moon." Lastly, Aerosmith, the winners of the Viewer's Choice award, received six nominations for their clip "Livin' on the Edge."

The show was also infamous for the on-stage pairing of drag queen RuPaul and comedian and TV legend Milton Berle. It was obvious from the beginning that the pair did not get along, and they traded harsh verbal barbs throughout their time on-stage. They reportedly continued their verbal sparring match backstage, with RuPaul commenting to Berle at one point, "You used to wear dresses, now you wear diapers!" RuPaul even claimed that Berle touched him inappropriately, and the entire event subsequently forced RuPaul to end what was, up until that point, a very prosperous professional relationship with MTV.

== Background ==
MTV announced in late June that the 1993 Video Music Awards would be held on September 2 at the Universal Amphitheatre. MTV cited complaints from members of the music industry concerning staging, traffic problems, and overcrowding during the 1992 ceremony as reasons for not returning to the Pauley Pavilion. Nominees were announced at a press conference held on July 21. Christian Slater was announced as host on the same day. Over 25 television programs contributed to the nominations packages, which were inspired by U2's Zoo TV Tour, including Roseanne, Jeopardy!, and Murder, She Wrote. The venue was modified to permit scenery and set changes for performers including doubling the width of the proscenium and replacing the back wall with a video projection screen. Producer Joel Gallen noted that the ceremony would "definitely have more of a sense of humor than past shows." The ceremony broadcast was preceded by the 1993 MTV Video Music Awards Opening Act. Hosted by Kurt Loder and Tabitha Soren with reports from Cindy Crawford, John Norris, and Alison Stewart, the broadcast featured red carpet interviews, pre-taped interviews with Mariah Carey and Soul Asylum, and pre-taped features on a day with Lenny Kravitz and the Video of the Year nominees.

== Performances ==
List of musical performances in order of appearance
Artist(s)	Song(s)	Ref.
Madonna	"Bye Bye Baby"	
Lenny Kravitz; John Paul Jones	"Are You Gonna Go My Way"	
Sting	"If I Ever Lose My Faith in You"	
Soul Asylum; Peter Buck; Victoria Williams	"Runaway Train"	
Aerosmith	"Livin' on the Edge"	
Naughty By Nature	"Hip Hop Hooray"	
R.E.M.	"Everybody Hurts" "Drive"	
Spin Doctors	"Two Princes"	
Pearl Jam	"Animal" "Rockin' in the Free World" (with Neil Young)	
The Edge	"Numb"	
Janet Jackson	"That's the Way Love Goes" "If"	

== Presenters ==
- Michael Richards – presented Best Alternative Video
- Dr. Dre, Snoop Doggy Dogg and George Clinton – presented Best R&B Video
- Kennedy and John Norris – appeared in a backstage vignette about Viewer's Choice voting
- Peter Gabriel and Natalie Merchant – presented Best Group Video
- Lyle Lovett and Arrested Development – presented Best New Artist in a Video
- Dan Cortese, Bill Bellamy and Steven Tyler – appeared in a backstage vignette about Viewer's Choice voting
- Christian Slater (host) – introduced the winners of previously announced categories
- Shaquille O'Neal and Cindy Crawford – presented Best Dance Video
- Martin Lawrence – presented Best Rap Video
- Beavis and Butt-head – presented Best Metal/Hard Rock Video
- John Walsh – appeared in a video vignette about Viewer's Choice voting
- VJs Sophiya Haque (Asia), Simone Angel (Europe), Daisy Fuentes (Internacional) and Gastão Moreira (Brasil) – announced their respective region's Viewer's Choice winner
- Milton Berle and RuPaul – presented Viewer's Choice
- Sharon Stone – presented Best Direction in a Video
- Whoopi Goldberg – introduced The Edge
- Keanu Reeves – presented Best Female Video and Best Male Video
- Tony Bennett and the Red Hot Chili Peppers (Anthony Kiedis and Flea) – presented Video of the Year
- Heather DeLoach (as "Bee Girl") – tap-danced for the audience during the show's closing

== Winners and nominations ==
Nominees were selected by approximately 200 individuals representing record labels, music journalism, music video production, radio, and film studios. Winners in all categories, except for the Viewer's Choice awards, were selected by over 700 members of the music industry.

Winners are in bold text.

Video of the Year	Best Male Video
**Pearl Jam – "Jeremy"**; Aerosmith – "Livin' on the Edge"; En Vogue – "Free Your Mind"; Peter Gabriel – "Digging in the Dirt"; R.E.M. – "Man on the Moon"	**Lenny Kravitz – "Are You Gonna Go My Way"**; Peter Gabriel – "Steam"; George Michael – "Killer/Papa Was a Rollin' Stone"; Sting – "If I Ever Lose My Faith in You"
Best Female Video	Best Group Video
**k.d. lang – "Constant Craving"**; Neneh Cherry – "Buddy X"; Janet Jackson – "That's the Way Love Goes"; Annie Lennox – "Walking on Broken Glass"	**Pearl Jam – "Jeremy"**; Depeche Mode – "I Feel You"; En Vogue – "Free Your Mind"; R.E.M. – "Man on the Moon"
Best New Artist in a Video	Best Metal/Hard Rock Video
**Stone Temple Pilots – "Plush"**; Tasmin Archer – "Sleeping Satellite"; Belly – "Feed the Tree"; Porno for Pyros – "Pets"	**Pearl Jam – "Jeremy"**; Aerosmith – "Livin' on the Edge"; Helmet – "Unsung"; Nine Inch Nails – "Wish"
Best R&B Video	Best Rap Video
**En Vogue – "Free Your Mind"**; Mary J. Blige – "Real Love"; Boyz II Men – "End of the Road"; Prince and The New Power Generation – "7"	**Arrested Development – "People Everyday"**; Digable Planets – "Rebirth of Slick (Cool Like Dat)"; Dr. Dre – "Nuthin' but a 'G' Thang"; Naughty by Nature – "Hip Hop Hooray"
Best Dance Video	Best Alternative Video
**En Vogue – "Free Your Mind"**; Janet Jackson – "That's the Way Love Goes"; RuPaul – "Supermodel"; Stereo MCs – "Connected"	**Nirvana – "In Bloom"**; 4 Non Blondes – "What's Up?"; Belly – "Feed the Tree"; Porno for Pyros – "Pets"; Stone Temple Pilots – "Plush"
Best Video from a Film	Breakthrough Video
**Alice in Chains – "Would?"** (from Singles); Arrested Development – "Revolution" (from Malcolm X); Boy George – "The Crying Game" (from The Crying Game); Paul Westerberg – "Dyslexic Heart" (from Singles)	**Los Lobos – "Kiko and the Lavender Moon"**; Aerosmith – "Livin' on the Edge"; Terence Trent D'Arby – "She Kissed Me"; Green Jellÿ – "Three Little Pigs"; George Michael – "Killer/Papa Was a Rollin' Stone"; Porno for Pyros – "Pets"
Best Direction in a Video	Best Choreography in a Video
**Pearl Jam – "Jeremy" (Director: Mark Pellington)**; En Vogue – "Free Your Mind" (Director: Mark Romanek); Los Lobos – "Kiko and the Lavender Moon" (Director: Ondrej Rudavsky); R.E.M. – "Man on the Moon" (Director: Peter Care)	**En Vogue – "Free Your Mind" (Choreographers: Frank Gatson, LaVelle Smith Jr. and Travis Payne)**; Mary J. Blige – "Real Love" (Choreographer: Leslie Segar); Janet Jackson – "That's the Way Love Goes" (Choreographer: Tina Landon); Michael Jackson – "Jam" (Choreographer: Barry Lather)
Best Special Effects in a Video	Best Art Direction in a Video
**Peter Gabriel – "Steam" (Special Effects: Real World Productions and Colossal Pictures)**; Aerosmith – "Livin' on the Edge" (Special Effects: Cream Cheese Productions); Terence Trent D'Arby – "She Kissed Me" (Special Effects: Michel Gondry); Billy Idol – "Shock to the System" (Special Effects: Stan Winston)	**Madonna – "Rain" (Art Director: Jan Peter Flack)**; Aerosmith – "Livin' on the Edge" (Art Director: Vance Lorenzini); Faith No More – "A Small Victory" (Art Director: Tyler Smith); Lenny Kravitz – "Are You Gonna Go My Way" (Art Director: Nigel Phelps); k.d. lang – "Constant Craving" (Art Director: Tom Foden); R.E.M. – "Man on the Moon" (Art Director: Jan Peter Flack); Sting – "If I Ever Lose My Faith in You" (Art Directors: Mike Grant and Andrew Elias)
Best Editing in a Video	Best Cinematography in a Video
**Peter Gabriel – "Steam" (Editor: Douglas Jines)**; Tasmin Archer – "Sleeping Satellite" (Editors: Jeff Panzer, Doug Kluthe and Evan Stone); Billy Idol – "Shock to the System" (Editor: Jim Gable); R.E.M. – "Man on the Moon" (Editor: Robert Duffy)	**Madonna – "Rain" (Director of Photography: Harris Savides)**; Duran Duran – "Ordinary World" (Director of Photography: Martin Coppen); En Vogue – "Free Your Mind" (Director of Photography: Thomas Kloss); k.d. lang – "Constant Craving" (Director of Photography: Marc Reshovsky); Sting – "If I Ever Lose My Faith in You" (Director of Photography: Ivan Bartos)
Viewer's Choice	International Viewer's Choice: MTV Asia
**Aerosmith – "Livin' on the Edge"**; En Vogue – "Free Your Mind"; Peter Gabriel – "Digging in the Dirt"; Pearl Jam – "Jeremy"; R.E.M. – "Man on the Moon"	**Indus Creed – "Pretty Child"**; Beyond – "The Great Wall"; Jerry Huang – "The Love March"; Mai – "Sia-Jai-Dai-Yin-Mai"; Tang Dynasty – "A Dream Return to Tang Dynasty"
International Viewer's Choice: MTV Brasil	International Viewer's Choice: MTV Europe
**Titãs – "Será Que É Isso o Que Eu Necessito?"**; Deborah Blando – "Decadence Avec Elegance"; Capital Inicial – "Kamikase"; Engenheiros do Hawaii – "Parabólica"; Nenhum de Nós – "Jornais"	**George Michael – "Killer/Papa Was a Rollin' Stone"**; The Beloved – "Sweet Harmony"; Björk – "Human Behaviour"; Peter Gabriel – "Digging in the Dirt"; Shakespears Sister – "Hello"
International Viewer's Choice: MTV Internacional	
**Luis Miguel – "América, América"**; Café Tacuba – "María"; Juan Luis Guerra y 440 – "El Costo de la Vida"; Mecano – "Una Rosa Es una Rosa"

== Artists with multiple wins and nominations ==
Artists who received multiple awards
Wins	Artist
4	Pearl Jam
3	En Vogue
2	Madonna
2	Peter Gabriel

Artists who received multiple nominations
Nominations	Artist
8	En Vogue
6	Aerosmith
6	Peter Gabriel
6	R.E.M.
5	Pearl Jam
3	George Michael
3	Janet Jackson
3	k.d. lang
3	Porno for Pyros
3	Sting
2	Arrested Development
2	Belly
2	Billy Idol
2	Lenny Kravitz
2	Los Lobos
2	Madonna
2	Mary J. Blige
2	Stone Temple Pilots
2	Tasmin Archer
2	Terence Trent D'Arby

== Music Videos with multiple wins and nominations ==
Music Videos that received multiple awards
Wins	Artist	Music Video
4	Pearl Jam	"Jeremy"
3	En Vogue	"Free Your Mind"
2	Peter Gabriel	"Steam"
2	Madonna	"Rain"

Music Videos that received multiple nominations
Nominations	Artist	Music Video
8	En Vogue	"Free Your Mind"
6	Aerosmith	"Livin' on the Edge"
6	R.E.M.	"Man on the Moon"
5	Pearl Jam	"Jeremy"
3	George Michael	"Killer/Papa Was a Rollin' Stone"
3	Janet Jackson	"That's the Way Love Goes"
3	k.d. lang	"Constant Craving"
3	Peter Gabriel	"Digging in the Dirt"
3	Peter Gabriel	"Steam"
3	Porno for Pyros	"Pets"
3	Sting	"If I Ever Lose My Faith in You"
2	Belly	"Feed the Tree"
2	Billy Idol	"Shock to the System"
2	Lenny Kravitz	"Are You Gonna Go My Way"
2	Los Lobos	"Kiko and the Lavender Moon"
2	Madonna	"Rain"
2	Mary J. Blige	"Real Love"
2	Stone Temple Pilots	"Plush"
2	Tasmin Archer	"Sleeping Satellite"
2	Terence Trent D'Arby	"She Kissed Me"
