= King (Belly album) =

Studio album by Belly
- Released: February 13, 1995
- Recorded: Compass Point (Nassau, Bahamas)
- Genre: Alternative rock
- Length: 45:00
- Labels: Sire; Reprise
- Producer: Glyn Johns

Belly chronology
Star (1993)	King (1995)	Dove (2018)

Singles from King
- 1. "Super-Connected" Released: 1995; 2. "Now They'll Sleep" Released: January 23, 1995; 3. "Red" Released: 1995; 4. "Seal My Fate" Released: July 10, 1995

King is the second studio album by American alternative rock band Belly, released on February 13, 1995.

Although the members had tightened their focus and polished their hook-laden songs, King and its singles did not meet label expectations in the post grunge-friendly atmosphere of 1995, and the band broke up shortly after it was released. The album sold over 350,000 copies. In the time since King's release, many (including some critics) have reconsidered the initial indifferent attitude towards the album and now hold it as an equal to Belly's highly regarded debut Star.

== Background ==
Belly released their debut studio album Star in January 1993, which peaked at number two in the United Kingdom and number 59 in the United States. Among its singles, "Feed the Tree" performed the best, reaching number 32 in the UK and number 95 in the US. Belly was nominated for a Best New Act at the Grammy Awards, and won Boston Music Awards for Best Modern Rock Act and Debut Album of the Year. Bassist Fred Abong departed in May 1993 and was replaced by Gail Greenwood. They travelled to Compass Point Studios in Nassau, Bahamas to record their next album.

Donnelly said, "Star was definitely written from a child's point of view, to a certain extent. There's really only one, "Red" — coming from that angle. The rest of them are relatively mature. From my perspective, I was a little bit conscious of it, because the littlegirl thing was played up the last time out, and I'm trying to sing like a 28-year-old woman this time."

== Release ==
Preceded by the "Now They'll Sleep" single in January 1995, King was released in February 1995. "Seal My Fate" was issued as the next single in July 1995. Belly went on a US tour with Catherine Wheel. They officially broke up in early 1996.

== Reception ==
Professional ratings
Review scores
Source	Rating
AllMusic	3.5/5 stars
Chicago Tribune	3/4 stars
Entertainment Weekly	B+
The Guardian	3/4 stars
Los Angeles Times	3/4 stars
NME	5/10
The Rolling Stone Album Guide	3/5 stars
Slant Magazine	4/5 stars
Spin	8/10
The Village Voice	A−

In 2012, King was listed at number seven on PopMatters' "15 Overlooked and Underrated Albums of the 1990s" list. In 2016, the album was hailed by Will Sheff of Okkervil River as "a winning, confident, masterful collection of songs – poppy and sweet and with a low-key psychedelic undercurrent. Everything good about Star was still there and had been expanded upon, but in many ways this felt like a new, reinvented band." Slant Magazine included it on their 2003 list of 50 Essential Pop Albums.

== Track listing ==
No.	Title	Writer(s)	Length
1.	"Puberty"	Tanya Donelly; Gail Greenwood	3:48
2.	"Seal My Fate"	Donelly	4:03
3.	"Red"	Donelly; Tom Gorman	3:35
4.	"Silverfish"	Donelly; Gorman	4:00
5.	"Super-Connected"	Donelly; Greenwood	4:25
6.	"The Bees"	Donelly	4:58
7.	"King"	Donelly	4:18
8.	"Now They'll Sleep"	Donelly; Gorman	3:14
9.	"Untitled and Unsung"	Donelly	3:33
10.	"L'il Ennio"	Donelly	3:45
11.	"Judas My Heart"	Donelly; Gorman	5:21
Total length:			45:00

== Personnel ==
=== Belly ===
- Tanya Donelly – vocals and guitar
- Christopher Gorman – drums and percussion
- Thomas Gorman – guitar and piano
- Gail Greenwood – bass and vocals

=== Technical personnel ===
- Glyn Johns – producer, mixing
- Jack Joseph Puig – engineer, mixing
- Oswald "Wiz" Bowe – assistant engineer
- Rail Jon Rogut – assistant engineer

== Charts ==
Chart performance for King
Chart (1995)	Peak position
Australian Albums (ARIA)	87
Dutch Albums (Album Top 100)	66
German Albums (Offizielle Top 100)	89
Scottish Albums (Official Charts)	13
UK Albums (Official Charts)	6
US Billboard 200	57

Chart performance for King
Chart (2025)	Peak position
UK Independent Albums (Official Charts)	15
