= Gene Severens =

American songwriter

- Born: Eugene Padanyi Severens; 22 June 1963
- Died: February 19, 2006 (aged 42); Worcester, Massachusetts, United States
- Known for: Musician (vocals, bass, guitar, songwriting); Painter; Multi-media
- Movement: Punk

Gene Severens (né Eugene Padanyi Severens; June 22, 1963 – February 19, 2006) was an American songwriter, musician and visual artist. He was the driving force behind a number of punk rock bands, first in Worcester, Massachusetts, but mostly in Providence, Rhode Island. In addition to lead vocals, Severens would perform on both bass and guitar, usually bass. As a visual artist, he worked in acrylic paint, ink, charcoal and mixed media. The aesthetic throughout was consistent: punk.

== Biography ==
Severens was influenced by early punk rock bands the Clash and the Dead Boys, Severens began writing song with Richard "Foghorn" Harnois with whom he founded the Aggressions c. 1984. The Aggressions, along with the Commandos and the Performers, constituted the core of Worcester's early hardcore punk scene, playing frequently at Ralph's Diner. The Aggressions enjoyed local radio success with their song "Howard Johnson's" about an ill-fated attempt to drive through a snow storm to a punk rock concert.

In Providence, Severens founded his most influential band, Boneyard, who opened for Goo Goo Dolls and Social Distortion. Members included Gail Greenwood who would later join Belly and L7. His other main Providence-based project was My Way. In 2003, he joined Benny Sizzler.

== The Scarecrow ==
The image of a scarecrow/crucifix appears throughout Severens' artwork, included as a tattoo on his right arm. This image served as a central theme for his views on the human condition: where Jesus gave the ultimate sacrifice to call down the doves of peace, modern religion has "made him a scarecrow, to chase the doves away", as Severens wrote in his song The Scarecrow.

The Scarecrow expresses the image and its meaning more fully. On the Boneyard recordings, Severens delivers the vocal, bringing his biting sarcasm to the fore. An alternate arrangement recorded by Severens' brother and accomplished cellist Michael Severens, features a simple vocal with cello accompaniment that brings out the more enduring themes to which the song points.

Severens died in February 2006, in Worcester, Massachusetts, at the age of 42 of liver disease.
