= New Wave Blues =

Studio album by the Wandas
- Released: 2009
- Recorded: July–August 2008
- Genre: Indie pop, rock
- Length: 48:10
- Producer: Patrick Krief

The Wandas chronology
New Wave Blues (2009)	The Wandas (2011)

Professional ratings
Review scores
Source	Rating
San Diego Entertainer Magazine	(favorable)

New Wave Blues is the debut studio album by the Wandas, independently released in 2009.

== Track listing ==
1. "New Wave Blues" – 4:39 McEachern / Battey
2. "Bending Over Backwards" – 4:07 McEachern
3. "Thank You Note" – 4:08 McEachern
4. "Please Come Home" – 3:53 McEachern
5. "Everyday (is as bad as monday)" - 4:43* McEachern / Battey
6. "Trepidation" – 4:11 McEachern / Battey / Lucivero / McElholm
7. "1 in 4" – 3:20 McEachern / Battey / Lucivero / McElholm
8. "Fighting a War" – 4:11 McEachern
9. "The Lady" – 4:09 McEachern / Battey
10. "Lose You – 6:16 McEachern
11. "Better Now" – 4:28 McEachern

== Videos ==
A music video was released for "Thank You Note", featuring upwards of 200 fans, family, and friends all singing the lyrics to the song. The video was successful and viewed tens of thousands of times. The video for "Thank You Note" was featured on Fuse TV on demand in July 2009.

== Personnel ==
- Keith McEachern - Lead vocals, guitar, synth, keys, piano, glockenspiel, percussion, sequencing
- Brent Battey - Guitar, background vocals
- Ross Lucivero - Bass guitar, background vocals
- Pete McElholm - Drums, percussion, sequencing
- Erica Mazaika - Additional Vocals on "Better Now"
- Patrick Krief - Producer, additional guitars, synth, piano, tambourine, background vocals
- J. Saliba - Engineer
- Ryan Morey - Mastering
- Brenda Van der Merwe - Violin
- Dimitar Petkov - Viola
- Leo Eguchi - Cello
- Matt Kane- Tenor saxophone
- Jeff Lizotte - Trumpet
