= Take Me Home (Zox album) =

Studio album by ZOX
- Released: January 3, 2003
- Genre: Alternative rock, reggae rock, ska
- Length: 57:17
- Label: Zox Music
- Producer: ZOX

ZOX chronology
Take Me Home (2003)	The Wait (2006)

Professional ratings
Review scores
Source	Rating
AllMusic	3/5 stars

Take Me Home is the first studio album by ZOX. It was released in 2003 on Zox Music.

== Track listing ==
1. "The Squid" – 4:57
2. "Butterfly" – 4:01
3. "Ghostown" – 3:23
4. "Goodbye to You" – 3:47
5. "Leaving Me" – 3:07
6. "Ode to the Mountain Pirates" – 2:19
7. "Rain on Me" – 4:16
8. "Homebody" – 3:18
9. "Delicious" – 3:32
10. "Stupid Song" – 3:36
11. "Cinco Ojos" – 1:56
12. "Starry Night" – 5:45
13. "Canon" – 5:40
14. "Eventually" – 2:58
15. "Spectacle Girl" (Hidden Track) – 4:42
