= Dove (Belly album) =

Studio album by Belly
- Released: May 4, 2018
- Studio: Stable Sound (Portsmouth, Rhode Island); Downwind Farm (Rhode Island); Lavastudio (New York); Studio 24 (Massachusetts); Rock 'n' Roll Control Center (Rhode Island)
- Genre: Alternative rock
- Length: 52:42
- Label: Belly Touring LLC; The Orchard
- Producer: Tom Gorman; Paul Q. Kolderie; Belly

Belly chronology
King (1995)	Dove (2018)

Singles from Dove
- 1. "Shiny One" Released: February 23, 2018; 2. "Stars Align" Released: March 29, 2018

Professional ratings
Aggregate scores
Source	Rating
AnyDecentMusic?	6.4/10
Metacritic	72/100
Review scores
Source	Rating
AllMusic	3.5/5 stars
The A.V. Club	C+
Classic Rock	8/10
The Line of Best Fit	7/10
Mojo	3/5 stars
Pitchfork	7.2/10
Q	4/5 stars
Rolling Stone	3.5/5 stars
Slant Magazine	3.5/5 stars
Uncut	8/10

Dove is the third studio album by American alternative rock band Belly, released on May 4, 2018. It was released twenty-three years after Belly's previous album King (1995) and their subsequent disbandment. The band reformed in 2016, and, following a successful reunion tour, chose to crowdfund a new album which would become Dove.

Dove continued the band's tradition of releasing albums with four-letter word titles.

== Track listing ==
All tracks are written by Belly (Tanya Donelly, Gail Greenwood, Tom Gorman and Chris Gorman).

No.	Title	Length
1.	"Mine"	5:20
2.	"Shiny One"	5:22
3.	"Human Child"	5:39
4.	"Faceless"	4:58
5.	"Suffer the Fools"	4:05
6.	"Girl"	4:44
7.	"Army of Clay"	3:39
8.	"Stars Align"	3:37
9.	"Quicksand"	4:27
10.	"Artifact"	4:20
11.	"Heartstrings"	3:26
12.	"Starryeyed" (hidden track)	3:05
Total length:		52:42

== Charts ==
Chart (2018)	Peak position
Scottish Albums (OCC)	13
UK Albums (OCC)	34
US Billboard 200	136
US Independent Albums (Billboard)	9
US Top Alternative Albums (Billboard)	12
US Top Rock Albums (Billboard)	27
