= Line in the Sand (ZOX album) =

Studio album by ZOX
- Released: January 22, 2008
- Genre: Alternative rock, reggae rock, ska
- Length: 41:47
- Label: SideOneDummy Records
- Producer: ZOX

ZOX chronology
| The Wait (2006) | Line in the Sand (2008) |

Professional ratings
Review scores
| Source | Rating |
|---|---|
| Absolute Punk | 86% link |

Line in the Sand is the third studio album by ZOX. It was released on January 22, 2008, through SideOneDummy Records.

== Track listing ==
1. "Line in the Sand" – 4:31
2. "When the Rain comes Down Again" – 3:40
3. "Goodnight" – 3:02
4. "Seventh Avenue Prophet" – 4:01
5. "Towards Los Angeles" – 3:57
6. "I Miss You" – 3:46
7. "Another Attack" – 3:15
8. "The Wait (Part II)" – 3:21
9. "The Same (Doesn't Feel the Same)" – 3:33
10. "Don't Believe in Love" – 4:12
11. "Lucky Sometimes" – 4:31

The first two singles from the album were "Goodnight" and "Line in the Sand". On the day of the record's release, ZOX signed autographs and played a free show inside a Newbury Comics store near their home town in Warwick, RI.
