= The Wait (ZOX album) =

Studio album by ZOX
- Released: June 6, 2006
- Genre: Alternative rock, reggae rock, ska
- Length: 51:39
- Label: SideOneDummy Records
- Producer: Ted Comerford & Zox

ZOX chronology
Take Me Home (2002)	The Wait (2006)	Line in the Sand (2008)

Professional ratings
Review scores
Source	Rating
AllMusic	3.5/5 stars
Stereology	5/10 stars

The Wait is the second studio album by alternative rock band ZOX. It was originally released by Armo Records in 2005. After Zox was signed by SideOneDummy Records, the album was re-released on June 6, 2006.

== Track listing ==
1. "The Wait" – 0:31
2. "Thirsty" – 2:37
3. "Carolyn" – 4:50
4. "A Little More Time" – 4:06
5. "Anything but Fine" – 4:05
6. "Better if It's Worse" – 3:03
7. "Bridge Burning" – 5:44
8. "Big Fish" – 5:07
9. "Can't Look Down" – 3:32
10. "Satellite" – 3:37
11. "Fallen" – 5:14
12. "Spades" – 4:57
13. "I Am Only Waiting" – 4:16

There is also a hidden bonus track called "Vampire".

The singles from this album are "Can't Look Down", "Carolyn", and "Thirsty".
