= Gail Greenwood =

American musician and illustrator (born 1960)

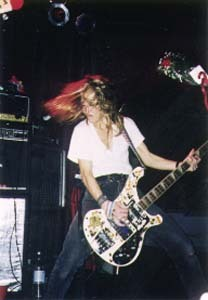
- Gail Greenwood performing with Belly in 1995

Background information
- Born: March 10, 1960 (age 66); Rhode Island, US
- Genres: Alternative metal; grunge; alternative rock; dream pop; punk rock; heavy metal
- Occupations: Musician; illustrator
- Instruments: Bass; guitar; vocals
- Years active: 1981–present
- Labels: Sire Records; Warner Bros.; Epitaph Records; Sub Pop
- Member of: Belly, Gang of Four
- Formerly of: L7, Boneyard, Bif Naked, Benny Sizzler

Gail Greenwood (born March 10, 1960) is an American musician and illustrator most notable for performing bass guitar and vocals with the bands Belly and L7.

== Career ==
Greenwood grew up in Rhode Island. She became a vegetarian at age fourteen and has been a lifelong adherent of straight edge, refraining from substance use. Having originally learned to play the baritone horn, Greenwood switched to guitar following high school. She earned a degree in illustration from the Rhode Island School of Design.

Her first band, the Dames, won the WBRU Rock Hunt in 1986. Later, Greenwood was a member of the Providence, Rhode Island–based band known as Boneyard, who opened for the Goo Goo Dolls, Social Distortion, and the Circle Jerks. In 1993, Throwing Muses alumna Tanya Donelly recruited Greenwood to join Belly as a bass guitarist. She played on that band's second album King and appeared on the cover of Rolling Stone. Donelly disbanded Belly in 1996 and Greenwood joined L7 as a bassist the following year. She continued with that group for three years. In 2001, Greenwood was recruited to play bass on tour in support of Canadian pop punk artist Bif Naked.

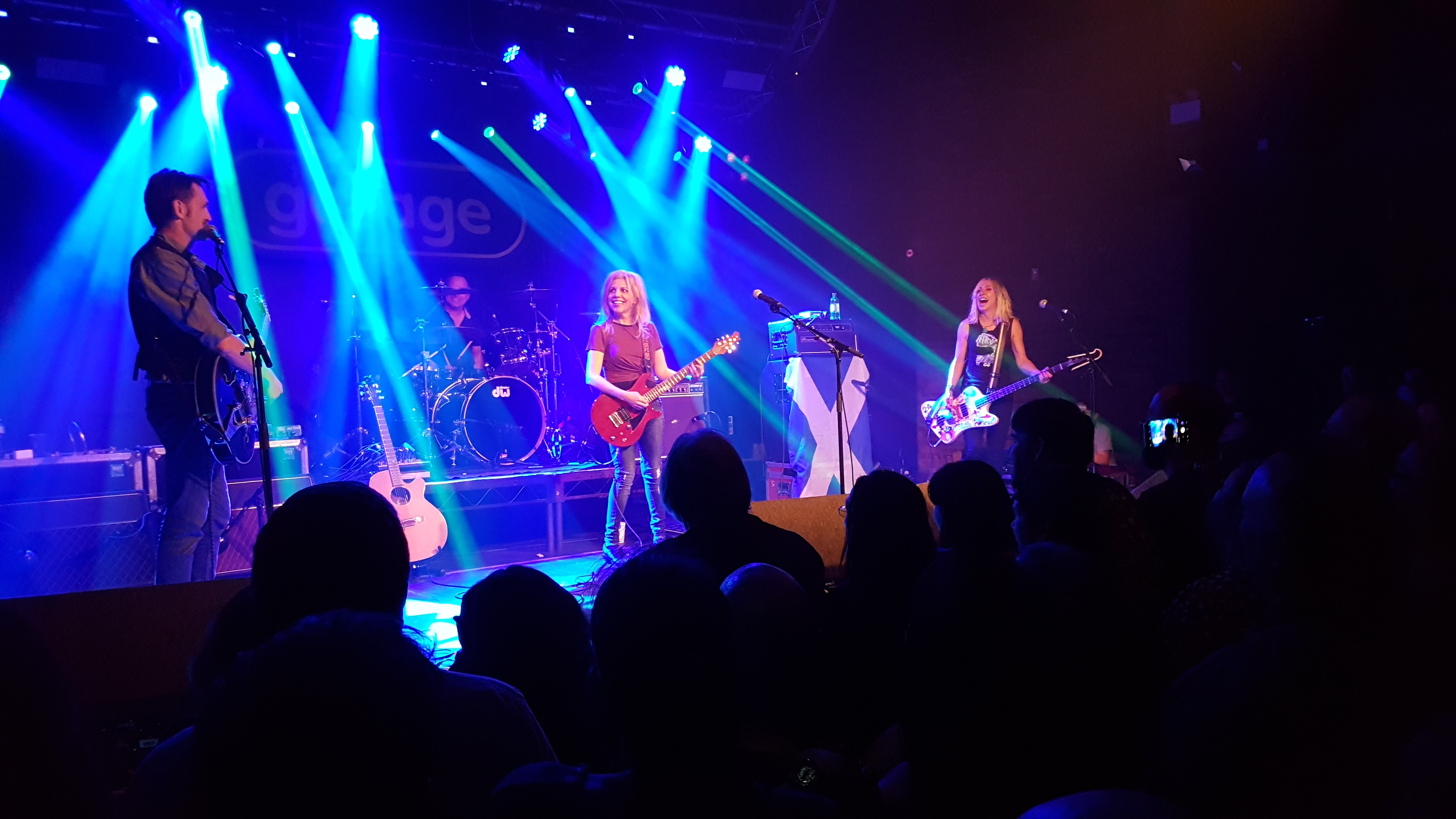
Gail Greenwood (right) performing with Belly in Glasgow, Scotland 2018

Greenwood and her partner, singer/bassist Chil Mott, formed the group Benny Sizzler in 2003 with guitarist Mark Tomis and drummer Slim Jim Colleran. Alumni of this band include drummer Tom Berglund, the late guitarist/singer Gene Severens (who had played with Greenwood in Boneyard) and guitarist Terry Linehan (a fill-in guitarist for Green Day). Greenwood and Mott remain active in anti-sprawl efforts, promoting the retention of open spaces, responsible development and lobbying for land conservation in the face of tremendous pressure by big-box corporations including Wal-Mart.

Greenwood resumed playing and writing music with Belly after the band reformed in 2016. A 2017 article with Vanyaland listed Greenwood's support for the Affordable Care Act following an endometrial cancer diagnosis discovered just prior to a scheduled reunion tour with Belly. Greenwood continued with chemotherapy and completed all the original tour dates as scheduled. In 2018, Belly released their third album, Dove, to generally favorable reviews.

In October 2024, it was announced that Greenwood would tour as a member of Gang of Four during their planned North American Farewell Tour in the spring of 2025.
