= Foxtrot Zulu =

- Origin: Providence, Rhode Island

Foxtrot Zulu is an American band based in the Providence, Rhode Island area. They toured the country for several years and recorded four original albums. Guitarist Nate Edmunds is currently a middle school principal in Jamestown, Rhode Island.

== Discography ==
- Moe's Diner (1995)
- Burn Slow (1997)
- Frozen in Time (1999)
- Tonight (2008)

Live album:

- Live... (2000)
