= Rhode Island's It for Me =

Official state anthem

- Regional anthem of Rhode Island
- Lyrics: Charlie Hall
- Music: Maria Day and Kathryn Chester
- Adopted: 1996
- Preceded by: "Rhode Island"

"Rhode Island's It For Me" is the regional anthem of the U.S. state of Rhode Island. It was officially adopted as the state song in 1996, replacing "Rhode Island" by T. Clarke Browne, which became the official state march.

== History ==
The lyrics were written by Charlie Hall, the music was written by Maria Day, and the piece was arranged by Kathryn Chester. Hall, a comedian, was known for poking fun at Rhode Island in the songs composed for the comedy troupes of "Charlie Hall's Ocean State Follies". Asked at some point after 1992 if he could write something good about the state, Hall penned "Rhode Island's It for Me".

The narrator describes falling in love with and finding a home in Rhode Island, despite having visited every other U.S. state. Much of the song uses ocean imagery, and references to Rhode Island's historic neighborhoods, landmarks, and leaders, including College Hill, the Jewelry District, the State House, and Roger Williams.

== Lyrics ==
I’ve been to every state we have

and I think that I'm inclined to say

that Rhody stole my heart

You can keep the forty nine.

Herring gulls that dot the sky,

blue waves that paint the rocks,

waters rich with Neptune's life,

the boats that line the docks,

I see the lighthouse flickering

to help the sailors see.

There's a place for everyone:

Rhode Island's it for me.

Rhode Island, oh, Rhode Island

surrounded by the sea.

Some people roam the earth for home;

Rhode Island's it for me.

I love the fresh October days,

the buzz on College Hill,

art that moves an eye to tear,

a jeweler’s special skill.

Icicles refract the sun,

snow falling gracefully.

Some search for a place that’s warm:

Rhode Island's it for me.

Rhode Island, oh, Rhode Island

surrounded by the sea.

Some people roam the earth for home;

Rhode Island's it for me.

The skyline piercing Providence,

the State House dome so rare,

residents who speak their minds;

No longer unaware!

Roger Williams would be proud to see

his “colony”

so don't sell short this precious port:

Rhode Island's it for me.

Rhode Island, oh, Rhode Island

surrounded by the sea.

Some people roam the earth for home;

Rhode Island's it for me.

Rhode Island, oh, Rhode Island

surrounded by the sea.

Some people roam the earth for home:

Rhode Island's it for me!

By Charlie Hall

An audio version of the song can be heard here.

== History ==
=== Song origin ===
Some sources suggest that local comedian Charlie Hall wrote the song after his second cousin Providence Mayor Vincent A. "Buddy" Cianci challenged Hall's frequent criticisms of Rhode Island. Cianci was likely referencing Hall's production of "Ocean State Follies" and "Rhode Bytes", both highly popular comedy shows that mocked state culture and political affairs, as well as Hall's leadership in the Rhode Island Comedy Festival. The song was first sung during Hall's "Ocean State Follies," and was performed on the show for years, with an overwhelmingly positive audience reception, before gaining lawmakers' attention as a contender for state song.

The state legislature prompted some rewrites to the lyrics, seeking expansion and diversification of state references, but ultimately approved the song and officially adopted it on July 29, 1996.

=== Notable performances ===
==== 1995 ====
Maria Day sang "Rhode Island's It for Me" at the closing of the Rhode Island gubernatorial inauguration of Lincoln C. Almond, on January 3, 1995.

==== 2014 ====
On March 26, 2014, candidate for Rhode Island governor Todd J. Giroux began his campaign by leading a fourth grade field trip to the Statehouse in a chorus of "Rhode Island's It for Me".

== Criticism ==
The official designation of "Rhode Island's It for Me" came under some criticism for its inaccurate and allegedly unsophisticated lyrics. One 1996 editorial for The Providence Journal suggested the song could have been "better composed by a third-grade gym class." The author also raised concerns over the lyrics' false affirmation of Rhode Island as a literal island.
