= Someday Providence =

American band

- Origin: Providence, Rhode Island, United States
- Genres: Reggae, alternative, pop, ska punk
- Years active: 2005–2009
- Labels: None
- Past members: Tommy Gardner; Eddy Maher; Tom "Fuzzy" Moran; Paul Giammarco; Nic Reuter
- Website: Official website

Someday Providence is an alternative/rock/reggae band from Providence, Rhode Island, United States. They are known for their seasonal song "Summertime in Rhode Island", which used to be played every year on WBRU during the summer. They have been acknowledged as heavy hitters in the local scene by winning "Best Breakthrough Act (2006)" and "Best Local Act (2007)" award in the annual Providence Phoenix Best Music Poll. 2008 showed them similar favor as finalists in the WBRU Rock Hunt. The Providence Journal called them "one of Rhode Island’s best-ever good-time bands".

== Discography ==
=== Full length albums ===
- The Hidden Vibe (2006) (White Noise Records)
- Thanks for Listening (2008) (self-released)

=== Singles ===
- Summertime In Rhode Island (2006)
- The Gentleman (2008)

== Trivia ==
- Many songs from the album The Hidden Vibe have been featured on MTV shows such as The Hills.
- "Be My Baby Tonight" played at the end of the MTV show Next.
