= Life in Film =

English indie rock band

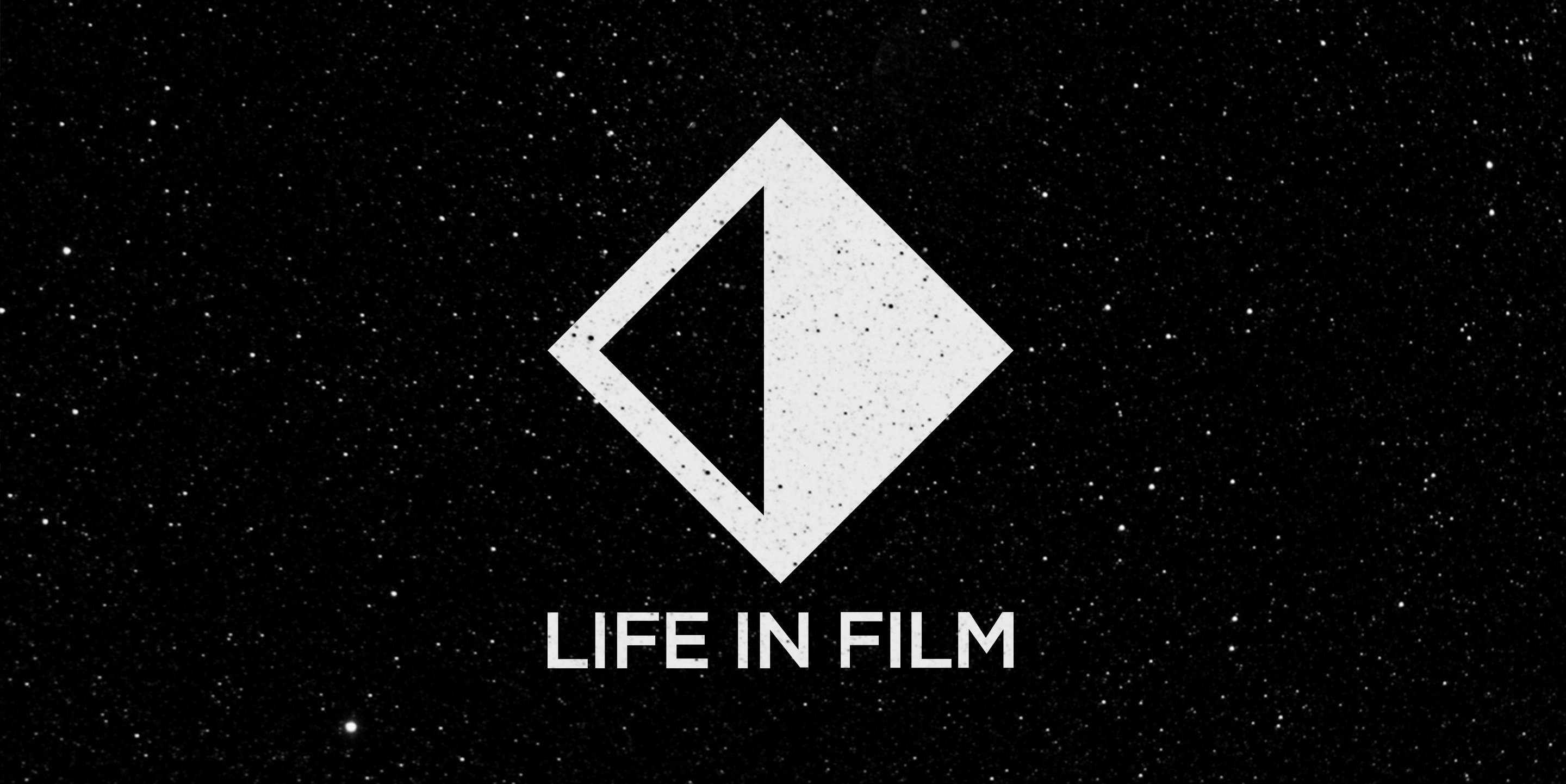
- LIF banner

Background information
- Origin: Hackney, East London, United Kingdom
- Genres: Indie rock, jangle pop
- Years active: 2010–2017
- Label: Embassy Of Music (Europe) +1 Records (USA)
- Past members: Samuel Fry; Edward Ibbotson; Dominic Sennett; Micky Osment

Life in Film were an English indie rock band. Originating in Hackney, East London, Life in Film consisted of members Samuel Fry (lead vocals, guitar), Edward Ibbotson (vocals, guitar), Dominic Sennett (vocals, bass), and Micky Osment (vocals, drums).

== Background ==
The quartet formed when lead vocalist Samuel Fry returned to London after studying at Bournemouth University, reuniting with old school friend, Edward Ibbotson. Soon after, Sennett and Osment, both of whom Fry had met at Bournemouth University, moved to London as well in order to establish a proper beginning for their band.

The band incorporated elements of modern indie and jangle pop, and fused a mixture of influences from artists such as the Smiths, the Doors, Belle and Sebastian, and David Bowie.

== Projects ==
=== Burberry Acoustic ===
The band was sought out by Christopher Bailey, Chief Creative Officer of Burberry, after they sent a video of their performance of their song, "Carla," to Dave Tree's "Watch, Listen, Tell" YouTube channel. Bailey had asked Fry to contribute to the Autumn/Winter campaign with some photo shoots. The relationship developed further after the band played "Alleyway" for Burberry's YouTube channel; the song would become "selected as the first track to front the Burberry Acoustic initiative," Bailey explained. The band would later perform their song "The Idiot" for the opening of Vogue's Fashion Night Out on 9 September 2010.

=== Debut album ===
Life in Film worked with the veteran indie producer Stephen Street on their debut album, which was released in 2015.

=== "The Idiot" ===
The band made a name for themselves with their popular single "The Idiot". A promotional CD of the song and an acoustic version was released on 14 November 2011. It was produced by Mike Crossey at the Motor Museum Liverpool Recording Studio. A music video was released on YouTube with the collaboration of artistic designer, Kate Moross.

=== Signing ===
The Band Signed to +1 Records (USA) and Embassy Of Music (Europe) in the tail end of 2014.

== Break-up ==
On 10 March 2017, the band announced their break-up via a Facebook post.

== Discography ==
=== Studio albums ===
- Here It Comes (2015)

=== Extended plays ===
==== Needles & Pins EP (2012) ====
Their debut EP was released on 20 August 2012 with the lead track "Needles & Pins" available for download.

Tracks:
"Needles & Pins" - 4:18
"Suitcase" - 3:33
"Carla" - 3:15
"Until It's Over" - 3:58
"Lose Control" - 3:36

==== Life In Film EP (2014) ====
Their self-titled second EP (Embassy Of Music Records) was released on 3 October 2014 with lead track "Are You Sure" available for download and limited edition colour vinyl in Europe.

Tracks:
"Alleyway" - 3:34
"Are You Sure" - 2:36
"The Idiot" - 3:07
"Anna Please Don't Go" - 2:44

=== Singles ===
Year	Single	Record label
2011	"The Idiot"	Self-released
2013	"Cold Wire"	Sony Music
2015	"Get Closer"	#35 Alternative Songs
