= M-80 (band) =

American punk band

M-80 is a punk band formed in Rhode Island, July 1999. The original line-up was Jeff Hanks (Guitar) and Dave Ladin (Vocals/Guitar) from the Rhode Island Ska/Punk band Racketball and Christian Blaney (Vocals/Bass) and Paul Sumner (Drums) of the local Rhode Island hardcore/punk band Arson Family. In 2002 Paul Sumner was replaced by Brian Bacon on drums. Brian was also a former member of Racketball. In 2003 Dave Ladin left M-80 to form Badfish: A Tribute to Sublime. At that point Jonny Safford stepped in as the new singer and lead guitar player. In that same year, they played on the Warped Tour and had a licensing deal with Fox Broadcasting Company. They also secured a sponsorship from Budweiser beer. Later in 2003 the M-80 track "Fight You For No Reason" appeared on the CD Future Icons put out by Atlantic Records which was given away free with an issue of Blender Magazine.

In 2004, founding member Christian Blaney left M-80 and the band broke up. They reunited in November 2009. The current line-up is Jeff Hanks, Christian Blaney, Jonny Safford and Paul Sumner.

The band released several full-length CDs as well as a number of singles.

== Discography ==
- 1999 - Self Titled 12 Song CD
- 2000 - "Don't Take It Away"
- 2002 - "Put Down the BB Gun"
- 2004 - "American Road"
