= The Wandas =

American rock band

the WANDAS
- the WANDAS : Performing at the South By Southwest Music Festival in Austin, Texas, March 2010

Background information
- Origin: Boston, Massachusetts, United States
- Genres: Rock, indie pop, folk rock, psychedelic rock
- Years active: 2002–present
- Label: T.F.M.R.A.
- Members: Keith McEachern; Brent Battey; Ross Lucivero; William Bierce
- Website: www.thewandas.com

the WANDAS are an American rock band based out of Boston, Massachusetts, composed of Keith McEachern, Brent Battey, Ross J. Lucivero, and William Bierce.

New Interface (a design with friends for the future) is the band's follow up to their critically acclaimed self-titled record, The Wandas. New Interface (a design with friends for the future), released on June 25, 2013, was produced by Joel Ford of Ford & Lopatin and mixed by Patrick Krief of The Dears. The Boston Globe stated "The Wandas 'New Interface (A Design with Friends for the Future),' is experimentation done right, as the band's more artistic forays add depth and intrigue to the sound without sacrificing the band's core of solid song craft.

Their self-titled album was released on August 30, 2011. It was featured in USA TODAY and was named one of the "50 best albums of the first half of 2011" by Guitar World.

== History ==
In 2008, the WANDAS teamed up with record producer Patrick Krief, guitarist of The Dears to record New Wave Blues. The album was tracked in Boston, Massachusetts, and mixed and mastered in Montreal, Quebec, Canada. New Wave Blues was both produced and mixed by Krief, and was mastered by Ryan Morey.

In 2009, New Wave Blues was released independently and has garnered international acclaim from several media outlets. "[ New Wave Blues is] full of sweet harmonies and music that is unburdened with extravagance" - Indie.mp3.co.uk. "[This is] some of the best pop I've heard this year" - Mary Leary; San Diego Entertainer Magazine."Both poppy and emotional, the [WANDAS] cut straight to the core with gorgeous harmonies, startling earnestness, and a sense of indie pop cool..." Telegram & Gazette.

From April 2009 until August 2010, the WANDAS spent most of their time touring the United States in their 1992 30 foot RV and building a grass roots fan base.

In 2010-2011, the WANDAS teamed up with Patrick Krief again to work on their latest studio album. The bulk of the album was tracked live in six days at MixArt Studios in Montreal, Quebec. The album was completely funded by their fans using Kickstarter, and featured guest appearances by members of The Dears, The Stills and Stars. The album was mixed by Dave Schiffman. Before its release the album was featured in USA TODAY.

The Wandas was released August 2011 to rave reviews. The Boston Globe said "It's a gorgeously warm and wistful work" and American Songwriter gave it four Stars, stating "The Boston based quartet’s dreamy pop-rock locks in on a mid-tempo groove and the organic sound captures the effortless strummy melodies and vocal harmonies that recall the days before slick production and too many overdubs robbed music of its magic." Guitar World named the self-titled record one of the "50 best albums of the first half of 2011".

Following the release of their self-titled album, the band hit the road for an extensive 13-week tour of the US, sponsored by Lands' End Canvas.

The WANDAS have been compared to Wilco, Tom Petty, Elvis Costello, and Bruce Springsteen.

== Notable awards and achievements ==
In December 2010, Time Out Magazine Boston selected The Wandas as Best Live Act of 2010. "The Wandas spent the better part of 2010 touring the bejesus out of their third album, New Wave Blues. In the process, they caused a few bloggers' jaws to hit the floor at South by Southwest and squashed the competition at WBRU's Rock Hunt battle of the bands."— Barry Thompson Time Out Magazine Boston

In November 2010, the Boston Music Awards nominated The Wandas as Best Pop Act of 2010.

In October 2010, CMJ Music Marathon wrote "With their big shout-along choruses and their classic rock melodies, the band managed to whip the crowd at the Bowery Poetry Club into a sugary frenzy".

In April 2010, the WANDAS won the 95.5 WBRU Rock Hunt, edging out several hundred bands who submitted for the competition.

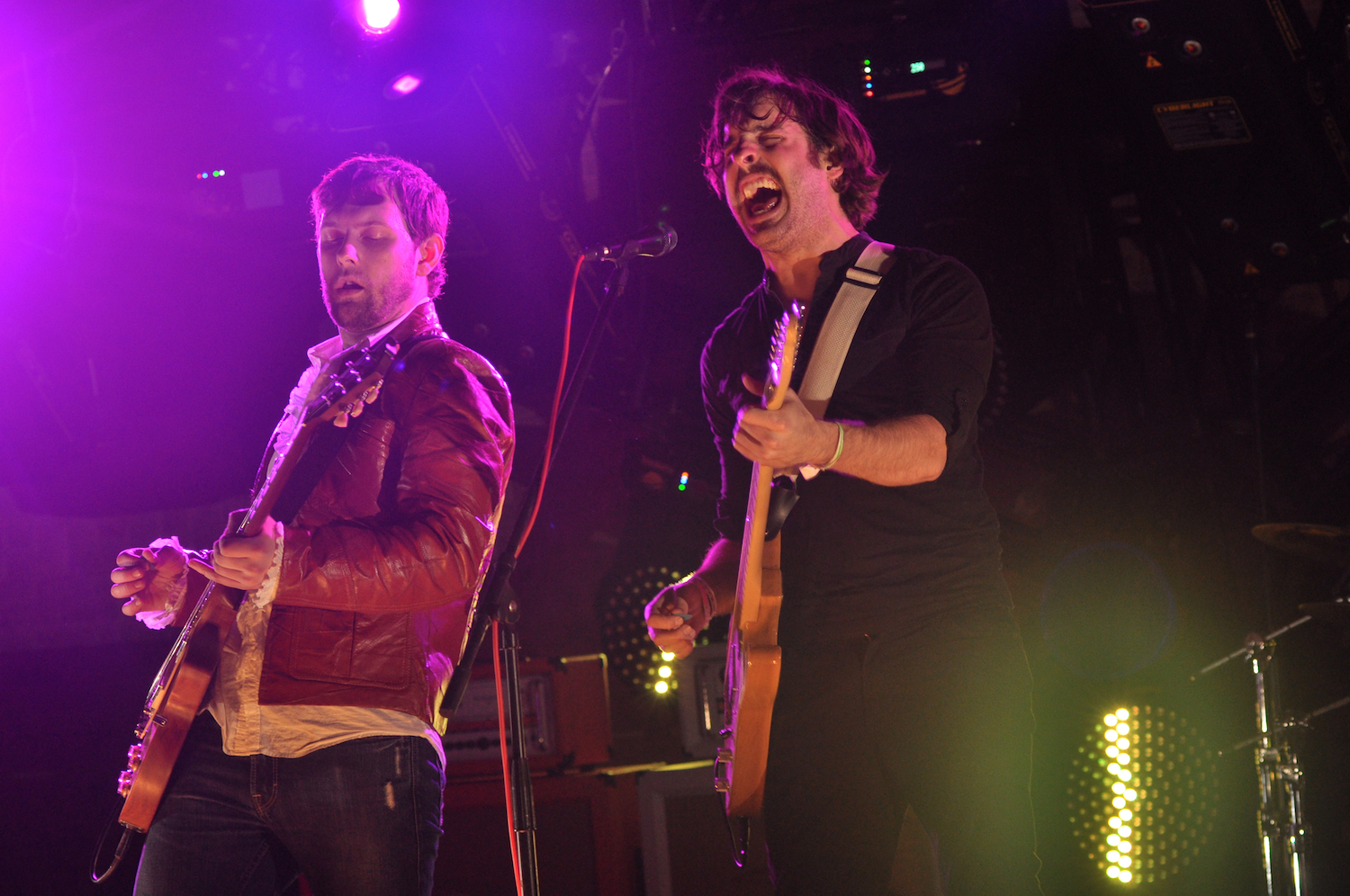
the WANDAS Performing at The South By Southwest Music Festival in Austin, Texas, March 14, 2010

In March 2010, the WANDAS performed several shows at the South By Southwest Music Festival in Austin, Texas US. The group gained momentum as the week of the festival progressed and were covered by several media outlets:

"...this Boston act is suddenly (only with much hard work and extensive touring, of course,) one of the best bands in America. As it ended up, they were easily one of the best live shows we saw in Austin last week." - Ryan Spaulding (Ryan's Smashing Life).

The Boston Globe was quoted as saying the WANDAS' "...sound is a dreamy lovechild of rock radio and your grandpa’s record collection..."

Both publications featured rave reviews of the WANDAS' performances at South By Southwest in 2010.

The WANDAS were the 92.9 WBOS best of Boston pick for 2008 and numerous other awards.

The WANDAS have supported Dawes, The Lumineers, The Dears, Justin Townes Earle, The Futureheads, The Duhks, Rustic Overtones, Elizabeth Ziman of Elizabeth & The Catapult, The Jane Shermans: featuring Angelo Petraglia, and Eulogies.

== Story behind name ==
There have been several stories surrounding the origin of their name. The Boston Herald reported, "They got their name when Brent Battey met a woman named Wanda in a Toronto bar back in 2003 when on spring break." Contrary to The Boston Herald report, guitarist Brent Battey noted on his Twitter page that the band was named after the Neil Young song, "Kinda Fonda Wanda" from his album, Everybody's Rockin'.

== Band members ==
=== Current ===
- Keith McEachern— Vocals, Guitar, Piano, Organ, Synth
- Brent Battey– Guitar, Vocals
- Ross Lucivero — Bass, Backing vocals

=== Past ===
- Brian Carson (2002–2005)
- Levin Gillespie (2003–2005)
- Pete McElholm (2002–2009)

=== Touring band ===
- William Bierce
- Greg Settino

== Discography ==
=== Official releases ===
- 2009: New Wave Blues
- 2011: The Wandas
- 2013: New Interface (a design with friends for the future)

=== Unofficial releases ===
- 2004: …if the accident will
- 2006: Can't Say Danger on the Radio
- 2008: You Should Have Listened EP
