= Patrick Krief =

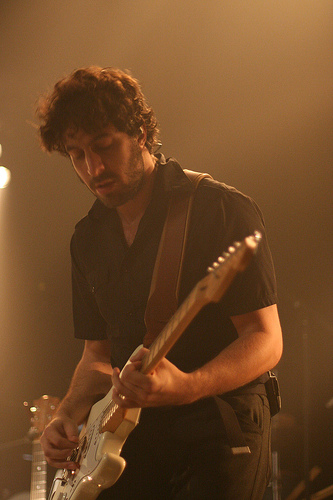
- Krief performing in Brussels in 2006

Background information
- Also known as: Krief
- Origin: Montreal, Quebec, Canada
- Occupations: Musician, songwriter, record producer
- Instruments: Vocals, guitar
- Website: Patrick Krief Official Site

Patrick Krief is a Canadian musician and singer-songwriter, most noted as a former guitarist for The Dears.

He was a guest on Jonathan Ross's show in 2005. In 2006, he made appearances on the Late Show with David Letterman, Last Call with Carson Daly, and Jimmy Kimmel Live!

In August 2007, Krief released his debut solo EP Take It Or Leave, which was co-mixed by former Dears bandmate Murray Lightburn. He toured internationally, including in Mexico, to promote the EP and his new solo career under the name of Krief. In 2009 Krief released Calm Awaits with his band Black Diamond Bay. In addition to being a musician, Krief is also a Record producer, he has self-produced all his albums and has worked as a session musician on albums for bands such as New Wave Blues; The Wandas' third LP released in January 2009 & Le Roxy Pro in 2014. In September 2016, Krief released a double album titled Automanic. Krief toured across Canada and Europe to promote the album. In January 2017, he appeared on CBC's Q to debut the title track, as well as the first track on the 20 song album.

Krief currently resides in Montreal.
