= Feed the Tree =

1993 single by Belly

- US CD maxi-single

Single by Belly

from the album Star
- B-side: "Trust in Me", "Dream on Me", "Star"
- Released: January 11, 1993
- Studio: Sound Emporium (Nashville, Tennessee)
- Genre: Alternative rock
- Length: 3:28
- Label: Sire, Reprise
- Songwriter: Tanya Donelly
- Producers: Belly, Gil Norton

Belly singles chronology
"Gepetto" (1992)	"Feed the Tree" (1993)	"Now They'll Sleep" (1995)

Music video
- "Feed the Tree on YouTube

"Feed the Tree" is a song by American alternative rock band Belly, released as the band's first single from their debut album, Star, in 1993. It is the band's biggest hit, reaching number one on the US Billboard Modern Rock Tracks chart and number 32 on the UK Singles Chart. According to lead singer Tanya Donelly, the song is a metaphor about commitment and respect, with the tree being a place on a large farm where a family would be buried.

== Reception ==
The song was ranked number 24 on VH1's "40 Greatest One-Hit Wonders of the 90s". It was also a popular radio hit in Australia, coming in at number 25 on the Triple J Hottest 100 countdown for 1993.

Pitchfork said the song, "takes advantage of Donelly's talent for punching holes in the wall with a killer chorus. Tom Gorman's serpentine riff coils around the verses while bassist Fred Abong and drummer Chris Gorman keep their rhythms flippy-floppy."

== Track listings ==
All songs were written by Tanya Donelly except where noted.

US CD and cassette single

1. "Feed the Tree" (remix) – 3:42
2. "Star" (full band version) – 2:59

UK 7-inch and cassette single

1. "Feed the Tree"
2. "Dream on Me"

UK 12-inch and CD single

1. "Feed the Tree"
2. "Trust in Me" (Robert Sherman and Richard Sherman)
3. "Dream on Me"
4. "Star"

== Charts ==
=== Weekly charts ===
Chart (1993)	Peak position
Australia (ARIA)	158
UK Singles (Official Charts)	32
US Billboard Hot 100	95
US Modern Rock Tracks (Billboard)	1

=== Year-end charts ===
Chart (1993)	Position
US Modern Rock Tracks (Billboard)	5

== Release history ==
Region	Date	Format(s)	Label(s)	Ref.
United Kingdom	January 11, 1993	7-inch vinyl; 12-inch vinyl; CD	4AD	
Australia	January 18, 1993	12-inch vinyl; CD	4AD	

== See also ==
- List of Billboard Modern Rock Tracks number ones of the 1990s
- Triple J Hottest 100, 1993
