= Belly (band) =

American alternative rock band

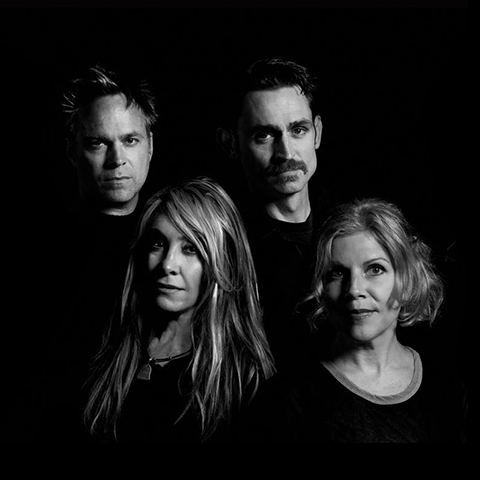
- Belly in 2017. Clockwise from upper left: Chris Gorman (drums), Thomas Gorman (lead guitar, backing vocals), Tanya Donelly (lead vocals, rhythm guitar), Gail Greenwood (bass, backing vocals).

Background information
- Origin: Newport, Rhode Island, United States
- Genres: Alternative rock, dream pop, jangle pop
- Years active: 1991–1996, 2016–present
- Labels: Sire, Reprise, Warner Bros., 4AD, Belly Touring
- Spinoff of: The Breeders; Throwing Muses
- Members: Tanya Donelly; Chris Gorman; Thomas Gorman; Gail Greenwood
- Past members: Fred Abong
- Website: bellyofficial.com

Belly is an alternative rock band formed in Rhode Island in 1991 by Tanya Donelly. The original lineup consisted of Donelly on vocals and guitar, Fred Abong on bass, and brothers Tom and Chris Gorman on guitar and drums respectively. The band released two albums during the early 1990s alternative rock boom before breaking up in 1995. They reunited in 2016 and mounted limited tours in the United States and United Kingdom that year.

In 1993, their debut album Star was released, and its lead single "Feed the Tree" would be Belly's biggest hit song, peaking at number one on Billboard's Modern Rock Tracks chart and number 95 on the Hot 100. Several additional singles from the album also appeared on the Modern Rock Tracks chart.

Shortly after the release of Star, Abong left the group and was replaced by Gail Greenwood. The band released their second album, King, in early 1995. Commercial and critical success did not match Star and the band broke up at the end of that year. Donelly embarked on a long solo career. She reformed Belly in 2016 with the same lineup that had recorded King, and their third album, Dove, was released in 2018.

== History ==
=== 1992–93: Formation and Star ===
All four original members of Belly knew each other from high school on Aquidneck Island, Rhode Island. The Gormans and Abong came out of the Newport hardcore punk scene (the Gormans having played in Verbal Assault, Abong in Vicious Circle). Donelly had previously co-founded two Boston-based indie rock bands, Throwing Muses and The Breeders, the former with her step-sister Kristin Hersh and the latter with Kim Deal of the Pixies.

Donelly named the band "Belly" because she thought the word was "both pretty and ugly." The band played their first concert on March 14, 1992 at the 3's bar in their hometown of Newport, Rhode Island.

The band's debut EP, Slow Dust (1992), made it to number one on the United Kingdom indie chart. Soon after, their single "Feed the Tree" made the Top 40 in the UK Singles Chart and their first album, Star (1993), hit number two on the UK Albums Chart.

In the United States, the album was RIAA certified gold, largely based on the success of "Feed the Tree" on Modern Rock radio stations and MTV, where the video was featured as part of MTV's Buzz Bin videos and Alternative Nation video show for much of 1993. Two follow-up singles were released, "Gepetto" and "Slow Dog," but neither matched the initial success of "Feed the Tree." Belly was nominated for two Grammys in 1994: Best New Artist and Best Alternative Music Performance for Star. The album went on to sell over 800,000 copies in the US alone. On several early '93 tour dates in the US and the UK, former Throwing Muses member Leslie Langston lent a hand on bass. In early 1993, they embarked on a 'joint headliner' tour with Radiohead. Following a short warm up tour of smaller venues in the UK also in early 1993, they embarked upon a larger tour where they were supported by the Cranberries.

=== 1994–96: King and break-up ===
Just after the release of Star, bassist Fred Abong left and was replaced by Gail Greenwood. Greenwood was originally a guitar player in a Boston-area metal band before being recruited to play bass in Belly. The live sound of the band evolved to accommodate her style, with its shows featuring more electric guitar than before and less of the dreamy quality of its first album.

As a result, the group's next album, King (1995), was more rock and roll oriented. The album's sales did not meet label expectations, and its numerous singles failed to sustain any significant airplay on Modern Rock radio. Belly appeared on the April 20, 1995, cover of Rolling Stone magazine. The band also performed "Superconnected" on the Late Show with David Letterman in June that year. It was one of the band's last major U.S television appearances. In the summer of 1995, Belly was one of the support bands in Europe for R.E.M. on their world tour, then finished out the year extensively touring the US with Catherine Wheel and Jewel as support acts.

In 1996, Donelly broke up the band. Speaking to Q, she explained the reasons behind her decision: "The first couple of years of Belly were a blast. Star was a big hit and we partied hard. But by the time we went to make King, there was a lot of negative stuff going on. King was a reaction to the bright shininess of Star and we weren't surprised when it didn't sell. I regret not making another Belly album, but at the time I thought, Screw it, I'm outta here."

After the break-up Tanya Donelly started a successful solo career and has since released several solo albums. Greenwood went on to stints playing bass for L7 and for Bif Naked, while playing guitar in her own Rhode Island–based band Benny Sizzler. Tom Gorman played briefly with Buffalo Tom, then on tour in 1999 with Kristin Hersh before joining up with his brother Chris in a commercial photography business based in New York City. Fred Abong first worked post-Belly as a carpenter "working in a high-end woodworking shop making fancy cabinets for rich people", then went on to earn a PhD in philosophy.

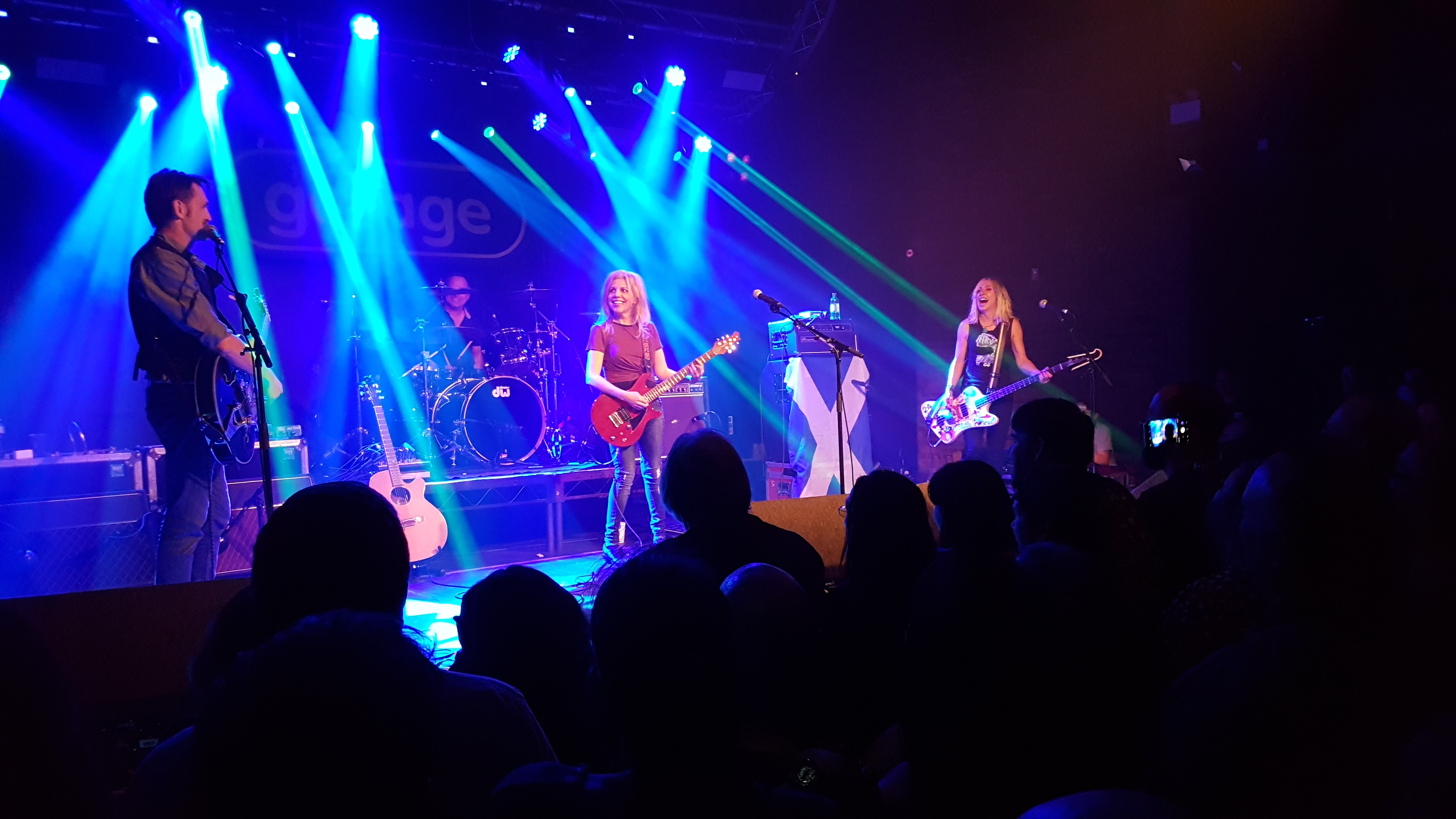
Belly performing Dove at the Glasgow Garage on June 16, 2018. The gig had to be moved at short notice due to the fire at the Glasgow School of Art destroying the O2 ABC the previous night.

=== 2016–2020: Reunion and Dove ===
On February 8, 2016, the band launched an official web site announcing a limited summer reunion tour with dates in the UK, Ireland and the US.

In advance of the tour, the band performed two warm-up shows in their hometown of Newport, Rhode Island, on July 8 and 9, the band's first live appearances since 1995. Two new songs, "Human Child" and "Army of Clay" were debuted on the tour that followed, hinting that the band was evolving, while at the same time maintaining familiar elements of the Belly "sound" of the past.

Belly announced in July 2017 that they had begun recording a third album, to be titled Dove. On October 5, 2017, the band started a PledgeMusic campaign for the album, and the album was released on May 4, 2018. On October 26, 2017, the band released their cover of "Hushabye Mountain" as an exclusive download on Pledgemusic- their first new recording in over 20 years.

"Shiny One", the first single from Dove, was released on February 23, 2018. Preceding the release of Dove, the band released the Feel EP for Record Store Day in April 2018.

In the summer and fall of 2018, the band went on a tour of the United States and Europe to promote the album.

For their 30th anniversary and for Record Store Day 2021, the band released a compilation of B-Sides and cover songs called Bees.

== Style ==
Belly vocalist Tanya Donelly's voice has been described as having a "fiery spark" with a "sweet rasp in her throat", with a style described as "down to earth."

== Band members ==
Current members

- Tanya Donelly – lead vocals, rhythm guitar (1991–1996, 2016–present)
- Chris Gorman – drums (1991–1996, 2016–present)
- Thomas Gorman – lead guitar, backing vocals, keyboards (1991–1996, 2016–present)
- Gail Greenwood – bass, backing vocals (1993–1996, 2016–present)

Former members

- Fred Abong – bass (1991–1993)

== Discography ==
=== Studio albums ===
Year	Album details
1993	Star: Release date: February 2, 1993; Label: Sire Records, Reprise Records
1995	King: Release date: February 14, 1995; Label: Sire Records, Reprise Records
2018	Dove: Release date: May 4, 2018; Label: Belly Touring LLC

=== Extended plays ===
- Slow Dust (1992)
- Gepetto (1992)
- Feed the Tree (1993)
- Moon (1993)
- Seal My Fate (1995)
- Now They'll Sleep (1995)
- Super-Connected (1995)
- Sun (1995)
- Feel (2018)

=== Singles ===
Belly singles and chart placements
Year	Song	Peak chart positions			Album
Year	Song	US	US Alt.	UK	Album
1992	"Gepetto"	113	8	49	Star
1993	"Feed the Tree"	95	1	32	Star
1993	"Moon"	—	—	—	Star
1993	"Slow Dog"	—	17	—	Star
1994	"Are You Experienced?"	—	—	—	Stone Free: A Tribute to Jimi Hendrix
1995	"Super-Connected"	—	35	—	King
1995	"Now They'll Sleep"	103	17	28	King
1995	"Red"	—	—	—	King
1995	"Seal My Fate"	—	—	35	King
2017	"Hushabye Mountain"	—	—	—	Non-album single
2018	"Shiny One"	—	—	—	Dove
2018	"Stars Align"	—	—	—	Dove
"—" denotes releases that did not chart or were not released in that region.

=== Compilation albums ===
- Baby Silvertooth (1993) – Japanese release
- Sweet Ride: The Best of Belly (2002)
- Bees (2021)

=== Songs contributed ===
- Stone Free: A Tribute to Jimi Hendrix (1993) – "Are You Experienced?"
- Generation X: Alternative Point of View (1994) – "Feed The Tree"
- Just Say Roe (Just Say Yes Vol. 7) (1994) – "It's Not Unusual"
- With Honors [Soundtrack] (1994) – "It's Not Unusual"
- UMPF (1995) – "Now They'll Sleep"
- Mallrats [Soundtrack] (1995) – "Broken"
- Sharks Patrol These Waters (1995) – "White Belly"
- This Is Fort Apache (1995) – "Star"
- Tank Girl [Soundtrack] (1995) – "Thief"
- Safe and Sound: A Benefit In Response To The Brookline Clinic Violence (1996) – "Think About Your Troubles"
- A Bunch O' Hits: The Best Rock of the 90's, Vol. 1 (1996) – "Feed The Tree"
- In Defense of Animals, Volume 2 (1996) – "Spaceman"
- Twister [Soundtrack] (1996) – "Broken"
- The Rolling Stone Women in Rock Collection (1998) – "Feed The Tree"
- Intimate Portrait: Women in Rock (1999) – "Feed The Tree"
- Out of Bounds: Journey Through Modern Rock (1999) – "Gepetto"
- Double Shot: Pop Alternative (2000) – "Feed The Tree"
- Rick and Morty [S1:Ep8] (2014) - "Seal My Fate"
