= Keith McEachern =

American musician and singer-songwriter

- Origin: Worcester, Massachusetts, United States
- Genres: Rock, pop, psychedelic, folk
- Occupations: Musician, songwriter, producer
- Instruments: Vocal, guitar, drums, piano, bass, alto saxophone, harmonica, glockenspiel.
- Years active: 2002–present
- Label: T.F.M.R.A
- Website: www.keithmceachern.com

Keith McEachern is an American musician and singer-songwriter. He is the frontman and co-founder of the Boston-based band the Wandas. McEachern released his debut solo album, titled Double Down, December 2, 2014. McEachern wrote, recorded, performed, mixed and produced the entire album himself.

== Notable reviews and press ==
The Boston Herald stated "[Double Down] shows off shimmering guitars, slinky bass lines, drums, keyboards, harmonies, ace songwriting and production George Martin would smile at."

The Boston Globe said "Pleasant (the second song off Double Down) is a seemingly insular, hushed composition with understated drums and bass, but the introduction of foundation-reverberating guitar swipes halfway through provides a sense of expanding space as eerie multi-tracked vocals color the sky pink and purple."

"In a very real way, [Double Down] casts McEachern as a man out of time, marrying a contemporary indie-rock mix of brightness and melancholy to a classic Brit-pop sensibility with small eruptions of garage rock discord." Telegram & Gazette
