= Throwing Muses discography =

- Studio albums: 10
- Extended plays: 5
- Soundtrack albums: 1
- Live albums: 2
- Compilation albums: 4
- Singles: 14

This is the discography for the work of rock band Throwing Muses.

== Albums ==
=== Studio albums ===
Title	Album details	Peak chart positions				
Title	Album details	US Heat	US Ind.	NL	NZ	UK
Throwing Muses	Released: September 1, 1986; Label: 4AD	—	—	—	—	—
House Tornado	Released: March 21, 1988; Label: 4AD/Sire Records	—	—	—	—	—
Hunkpapa	Released: January 23, 1989; Label: 4AD/Sire Records	—	—	—	—	59
The Real Ramona	Released: February 18, 1991; Label: 4AD/Warner Bros. Records	—	—	—	—	26
Red Heaven	Released: August 10, 1992; Label: 4AD/Warner Bros. Records	—	—	63	—	13
University	Released: January 16, 1995; Label: 4AD/Sire Records/Reprise Records	10	—	70	44	10
Limbo	Released: August 13, 1996; Label: 4AD/Rykodisc/Throwing Music	34	—	87	—	36
Throwing Muses	Released: March 17, 2003; Label: 4AD	—	26	—	—	75
Purgatory/Paradise	Released: November 11, 2013; Label: Throwing Music	—	—	—	—	—
Sun Racket	Released: September 2020; Label: Fire Records	—	—	—	—	—
Moonlight Concessions	Released: March 14, 2025; Label: Fire Records	—	—	—	—	—

=== Live albums ===
Title	Album details
The Curse	Released: 1992; Label: 4AD
Live In Providence	Released: 2001; Label: Throwing Music

=== Compilation albums ===
Title	Album details
Doctor Death's Volume I - Cette Enfant Me Fia Mourir	Released: 1986; Label: C'est la Mort
Lonely Is an Eyesore	Released: 1987; Label: 4AD
Just Say Yes	Released: 1987; Label: Sire
Just Say Anything	Released: 1991; Label: Sire
This Is Fort Apache	Released: 1995; Label: MCA Records
Huh 6	Released: 1995; Label: huH (magazine)
Indie Rock Blueprint	Released: 10 Aug 1996; Label: Go Compact Disks
WRAS 88.5fm Present: Radio ODDyssey	Released: 1996; Label: Ichiban International
In a Doghouse	Released: September 15, 1998; Label: 4AD
1980 Forward - Celebrating 25 Years	Released: 2005; Label: 4AD
Anthology	Released: September 20, 2011; Label: 4AD

== EPs ==
Title	EP details
Stand Up	Released: 1984; Self-released
Chains Changed	Released: 1987; Label: 4AD
The Fat Skier	Released: 1987; Label: 4AD
Counting Backwards	Released: 1991; Label: 4AD
Live To Tape	Released: 1997; Label: Rykodisc/Throwing Music

== Singles ==
Title	Year	Peak chart positions		Album	B-sides
Title	Year	US Alt.	UK	Album	B-sides
"Saving Grace"	1988	—	—	House Tornado	
"The River"	1988	—	—	House Tornado	
"Dizzy"	1989	8	85	Hunkpapa	"Mania (live)" and "Downtown (live)"
"Counting Backwards"	1991	11	70	The Real Ramona	"Same Sun", "Cottonmouth" and "Amazing Grace"
"Not Too Soon"	1991	—	88	The Real Ramona	"Cry Baby Cry", "Him Dancing (remix)" and "Dizzy (remix)"
"Firepile"	1992	—	46	Red Heaven	"Manic Depression", "City of the Dead", "Jak," "Ride Into The Sun" and "Handsome Woman"
"Bright Yellow Gun"	1994	20	51	University	"Crayon Sun", "Red Eyes" and "Like A Dog"
"Shimmer"	1995	—	—	University	
"Snakeface"	1995	—	—	University	
"Ruthie's Knocking"	1996	—	—	Limbo	"Tar Moochers", "Serene Swing" and "Limbobo"
"Shark"	1996	—	53	Limbo	
"Freeloader"	1996	—	—	Limbo	"If...", "Take (live)" and "Heel Toe"
"Mercury"	2003	—	—	Throwing Muses	
"Portia"	2003	—	—	Throwing Muses	
"Dark Blue"	2020	—	—	Sun Racket	
"Bo Diddley Bridge"	2020	—	—	Sun Racket	
"Frosting"	2020	—	—	Sun Racket	
