= Stand Up =

Stand Up may refer to:

== Arts, entertainment, and media ==
- Stand-up comedy, a comic style in which a comedian performs in front of a live audience

=== Film ===
- Stand Up (2007 film), a film featuring Modi Rosenfeld
- Stand Up (2019 film), a Malayalam film directed by Vidhu Vincent
- The Stand Up, a 2011 comedy/drama written and directed by David Wexler

=== Music ===
- Stand Up! Records, an American record label
- Stand Up (band), an American melodic hardcore band recording for CI Records

==== Albums ====
- Stand Up (Dave Matthews Band album) or the title song, "Stand Up (For It)", 2005
- Stand Up (The Del Fuegos album), 1987
- Stand Up (Everyday Sunday album) or the title song, 2002
- Stand Up (Jethro Tull album), 1969
- Stand Up (Right Said Fred album) or the title song (see below), 2002
- Stand Up (Steve Morse Band album) or the title song, 1985
- Stand Up (EP) or the title song, by Big Bang, 2008
- Stand Up! (album) or the title song, by the Archers, 1979
- Stand Up, by Blue King Brown, 2006
- Stand Up, by Final Conflict, 1997
- Stand Up, by Leslie Cheung, 1986
- Stand Up, by Mel McDaniel, or the title song (see below), 1985
- Stand Up, an EP by Throwing Muses, 1984

==== Songs ====
- "Stand Up" (All That Remains song), 2012
- "Stand Up" (Cynthia Erivo song), 2019
- "Stand Up" (Dirty Werk song), 2018
- "Stand Up" (The Feelers song), 2004; covered by Stan Walker (2010)
- "Stand Up" (James Cottriall song), 2012
- "Stand Up" (Jet song), 2007
- "Stand Up" (Jimmy Barnes song), 1993
- "Stand Up" (Jolin Tsai song), 2017
- "Stand Up!" (Lead song), 2008
- "Stand Up" (Love Tribe song), 1996
- "Stand Up" (Ludacris song), 2003
- "Stand Up" (Mai Kuraki song), 2001
- "Stand Up" (Mel McDaniel song), 1985
- "Stand Up" (Scribe song), 2003
- "Stand Up" (Trapt song), 2005
- "Stand Up" (The Triffids song), 1981
- "Stand Up (For the Champions)", by Right Said Fred, 2002
- "Stand Up (Kick Love into Motion)", by Def Leppard, 1993
- "Stand Up!", a chant by football supporters to the tune of "Go West"
- "Stand Up", by 8Ball & MJG from Ridin' High
- "Stand Up", by AC/DC from Fly on the Wall
- "Stand Up", by Al Green from Call Me
- "Stand Up", by Bobby Womack from The Poet
- "Stand Up", by the Cab from Lock Me Up
- "Stand Up", by Cheryl Cole from 3 Words
- "Stand Up", by David Lee Roth from Skyscraper
- "Stand Up", by Dave Gahan, released as a B-side on the single "Dirty Sticky Floors"
- "Stand Up", by the Dead 60s from Time to Take Sides
- "Stand Up", by Fireflight from Unbreakable
- "Stand up", by Five for Fighting from Slice
- "Stand Up", by Flobots from Fight with Tools
- "Stand Up", by Hazell Dean
- "Stand Up", by James Bay from Electric Light
- "Stand Up", by Jessie J from Who You Are
- "Stand Up", by KC and the Sunshine Band from The Painter
- "Stand Up", by Minor Threat from Flex Your Head
- "Stand Up", by One Direction from Up All Night
- "Stand Up", by Pennywise from The Fuse
- "Stand Up", by the Prodigy from Invaders Must Die
- "Stand Up", by Prussian Blue
- "Stand Up", by Rick Springfield from the movie soundtrack Hard to Hold
- "Stand Up", by Santana from Marathon
- "Stand Up", by Seeed from Next!
- "Stand Up", by Shaggy from Clothes Drop
- "Stand Up", by Stan Walker from From the Inside Out
- "Stand Up", by Steel Dragon from the soundtrack of the film Rock Star
- "Stand Up", by Throwing Muses from Throwing Muses
- "Stand Up", by Thunder from Behind Closed Doors
- "Stand Up", by T.I. from Urban Legend
- "Stand Up", by Underworld from Change the Weather
- "Stand Up", by Woe, Is Me from American Dream
- "Stand Up", by X1 from Emergency: Quantum Leap

=== Radio and television ===
- Stand Up! with Pete Dominick, a comedy talk show on Sirius XM
- Stand Up! (Japanese TV series), a 2003 drama series
- "Stand Up" (Quantum Leap), a 1992 TV episode
- "Stand Up" (Stewart Lee's Comedy Vehicle), a 2011 TV episode
- Stand Up, a 1995 installment of the American anthology series CBS Schoolbreak Special

== Other uses ==
- Stand Up! for Democracy in DC Coalition, a citizens' advocacy group
- STAND UP, an education initiative funded by the Bill & Melinda Gates Foundation
- Stand-up fighting, a type of hand-to-hand combat
- Stand-up meeting, a daily team meeting, in agile software development

== See also ==
- Stand Up and Cheer (disambiguation)
- Stand Up, Stand Up, a 2009 EP by Hanson
- Stood Up (disambiguation)
