= Throwing Muses (disambiguation) =

Throwing Muses is an American musical group.

Throwing Muses may also refer to:

- Throwing Muses (1986 album)
- Throwing Muses (2003 album)
