= Moonlight Concessions =

2025 studio album by Throwing Muses

Studio album by Throwing Muses
- Released: March 14, 2025
- Studio: Stable Sound (Portsmouth, Rhode Island)
- Genre: Alternative rock
- Length: 29:21
- Label: Fire
- Producer: Kristin Hersh; Steve Rizzo

Throwing Muses chronology
Sun Racket (2020)	Moonlight Concessions (2025)

Singles from Moonlight Concessions
- 1. "Drugstore Drastic" Released: November 12, 2024; 2. "Summer of Love" Released: January 8, 2025; 3. "Libretto" Released: February 5, 2025

Moonlight Concessions is the eleventh studio album by the American alternative rock band Throwing Muses. Released on March 14, 2025, by Fire, it follows the band's 2020 album Sun Racket and the frontwoman Kristin Hersh's 2023 album Clear Pond Road.

== Background and release ==
In 2020, the alternative rock band Throwing Muses released their tenth studio album Sun Racket. The band's frontwoman Kristin Hersh released her eleventh solo studio album Clear Pond Road in 2023. Hersh wrote the band's eleventh studio album, Moonlight Concessions, in the Southern United States along the Gulf of Mexico, New Orleans, and Southern California. It was recorded at Stable Sound and produced by Hersh in Portsmouth, Rhode Island, where the band is headquartered. In an interview with Paste, Hersh said that the album represents a return to the band's sound before the release of their debut album Throwing Muses (1986). The album has three singles: "Drugstore Drastic" (2024), "Summer of Love" (2025), and "Libretto" (2025). It was released on March 14, 2025, by Fire.

== Companion album ==
Throwing Muses released a companion album, Moonlight Confessions, simultaneously with Moonlight Concessions. The companion album contains alternative versions of the songs and was released as a limited edition of 1,000 vinyl LPs through Rough Trade.

== Critical reception ==
Professional ratings
Aggregate scores
Source	Rating
AnyDecentMusic?	7.4/10
Metacritic	79/100
Review scores
Source	Rating
AllMusic	3.5/5 stars
Classic Rock	7/10 stars
The Guardian	4/5 stars
MusicOMH	3.5/5 stars
Record Collector	4/5 stars
Uncut	8/10

According to the review aggregator Metacritic, Moonlight Concessions received "generally favorable reviews" based on a weighted average score of 79 out of 100 from 8 critic scores. Editors at AllMusic rated this album 3.5 out of 5 stars, with critic Heather Phraes writing that although she could "not always ... tell the difference" between the album and Kristin Hersh's 2023 solo studio album Clear Pond Road, the album "deliver[ed]" for Hersh's fans and "reaffirm[ed] just how high the bar is when it comes to Hersh's music". John Murphy in musicOMH also rated the album 3.5 out of 5 stars, calling it a "reliably compelling missive from a rare talent". In The Guardian, Stevie Chick gave the album 4 out of 5 stars, praising Hersh's "silvery snarl". She compared the album to Nirvana's 1994 MTV Unplugged in New York, writing that they both "conjure a dark, parched ambience" and have an "austerity and tension". Mark Beaumont rated the album 7 out of 10 for Classic Rock, stating that the album has "a mood as immersive as Raymond Carver". Andrew Mueller in Uncut wrote that the album showed the band "growing no less peculiar and wondrous for their familiarity". Chris Roberts in Record Collector rated the album 4 out of 5 stars and called it "ingenious".

== Track listing ==
All tracks are written by Kristin Hersh.

No.	Title	Length
1.	"Summer of Love"	2:59
2.	"South Coast"	3:35
3.	"Theremini"	3:13
4.	"Libretto"	2:47
5.	"Albatross"	3:39
6.	"Sally's Beauty"	3:30
7.	"Drugstore Drastic"	3:27
8.	"You're Clouds"	3:31
9.	"Moonlight Concessions"	2:36
Total length:		29:21

== Personnel ==
=== Throwing Muses ===
- Kristin Hersh – lead vocals, guitar, production
- David Narcizo – drums
- Bernard Georges – bass

=== Additional contributors ===
- Steve Rizzo – production, mixing
- Pete Harvey – cello

== Charts ==
Chart performance for Moonlight Concessions
Chart (2025)	Peak position
Scottish Albums (OCC)	13
UK Album Downloads (OCC)	27
UK Independent Albums (OCC)	5

Chart performance for Moonlight Confessions
Chart (2025)	Peak position
Scottish Albums (OCC)	53
UK Independent Albums (OCC)	19
