= Sun Racket =

Studio album by Throwing Muses
- Released: September 4, 2020
- Recorded: February–June 2020
- Genre: Alternative rock
- Length: 34:28
- Language: English
- Label: Fire
- Producers: Kristin Hersh; Steve Rizzo

Throwing Muses chronology
Purgatory/Paradise (2013)	Sun Racket (2020)	Moonlight Concessions (2025)

Sun Racket is the tenth studio album by American alternative rock band Throwing Muses. The album was released on Fire Records on September 4, 2020, and has received positive reviews from critics.

== Recording and release ==
Although it had been seven years since Purgatory/Paradise and a decade prior to that since Throwing Muses, primary songwriter Kristin Hersh had continuously been writing songs both for Throwing Muses and her project 50 Foot Wave, and the songwriting for this album was influenced by the harder rock sound of the latter band. She was only motivated to make a new Throwing Muses album once she had the right songs that sounded appropriate for this group. According to Hersh, the distinction is so stark that she has written them in a fugue state as a response to post-traumatic stress disorder and has no memory of their composition.

The first single from the album, "Dark Blue", was released in February 2020. The second single, "Bo Diddley Bridge", was released in July, and the third, "Frosting", in August.

The album had a planned release date of May 22, 2020 but was later delayed to September 4, 2020.

== Critical reception ==
Professional ratings
Aggregate scores
Source	Rating
AnyDecentMusic?	7.8/10
Metacritic	83/100
Review scores
Source	Rating
AllMusic	4/5 stars
The Arts Desk	4/5 stars
Louder Than War	4/5
Mojo	4/5 stars
MusicOMH	4/5 stars
Tom Hull – on the Web	B+
Uncut	8/10
Under the Radar	8/10

According to the review aggregator Metacritic, Sun Racket received "universal acclaim" based on a weighted average score of 83 out of 100 from five critic scores. Album of the Year summarizes critical consensus as an 80 out of 100, based on seven reviews and AnyDecentMusic? scores it a 7.8 out of 10 with five reviews.

Writing for Louder Than War, Nathan Whittle gave the release four out of five bombs, summing up the release as "a wonderful return for Throwing Muses and one that sees them really channeling their best". The editorial staff of AllMusic also gave the album four out of five stars, with reviewer Heather Phares and stated that, "the sheer density of Sun Racket makes it something of a grower, but fans will be more than willing to take the time to let these songs sink into them". In Bust, Michael Levine calls this "a standout moment in this seminal band’s musical canon". Online music platform Bandcamp highlighted this as Album of the Day, with Mariana Timony summing up that Sun Racket "has the sense of being poised between the material and the immaterial worlds, one foot in the earthiness of visceral rock music and the other in the magical realm from which springs that rarest of musical gifts: chemistry". Andy Von Pip of Under the Radar gave the release an 8 out of 10 for having 10 "near-perfect songs".

Reviews from British outlets The Arts Desk, Mojo, and musicOMH all assessed Sun Racket as four out of five stars: for the first, Guy Oddy calls Sun Racket "floaty and ethereal melodies blend and twist around the raw and the primal to produce something truly magnificent, as Throwing Muses cast a disorientating but wholly satisfying spell with their first album in seven years", followed by Sam Shephard due to the duality of "dark and light, loud and quiet, beautiful and ugly [with] the oppositional forces combin[ing] with powerful effect" for "songs worth revisiting over and over again", and Mojo's Matin Anson praising the diversity of sounds as well and Hersh's willingness to experiment as a songwriter. In Uncut, Daniel Day Wray gave this release an 8 out of 10 for "seamlessly blend[ing] discordance with harmony". David Taylor of The London Evening Standard writes that Sun Racket is "as accomplished as when the band were in their late-Eighties/early-Nineties pomp" and Sean Kitchling of The Quietus hopes "this album might also serve to bring word of Throwing Muses inspiring music to a new generation".

== Track listing ==
No.	Title	Length
1.	"Dark Blue"	3:55
2.	"Bywater"	3:53
3.	"Maria Laguna"	1:54
4.	"Bo Diddley Bridge"	3:25
5.	"Milk at McDonald's"	2:48
6.	"Upstairs Dan"	3:44
7.	"St Charles"	1:55
8.	"Frosting"	4:58
9.	"Kay Catherine"	4:12
10.	"Sue's"	3:50
Total length:		34:28

== Personnel ==
Throwing Muses

- Bernard Georges – bass guitar
- Kristin Hersh – guitar, vocals, mixing, production
- David Narcizo – drums

Additional personnel

- Steve Rizzo – production, mastering
