= Bright Yellow Gun =

1994 single by Throwing Muses

Single by Throwing Muses

from the album University
- Released: December 12, 1994
- Recorded: Kingsway Studios, New Orleans, LA 1993
- Length: 3:40
- Label: 4AD, Sire Records
- Songwriter: Kristin Hersh
- Producer: Throwing Muses

Throwing Muses singles chronology
"Not Too Soon" (1991)	"Bright Yellow Gun" (1994)	"Shark" (1996)

Twelve-inch cover

"Bright Yellow Gun" is the only single by Throwing Muses from their 1995 album University. An accompanying video was also made directed by Kevin Kerslake.

== Track listing ==
All songs written by Kristin Hersh except Crayon Sun, originally released by Latin Playboys on their 1994 self-titled album.

No.	Title	Length
1.	"Bright Yellow Gun"	3:40
2.	"Crayon Sun" (David Hidalgo, Louie Perez)	4:19
3.	"Red Eyes"	2:57
4.	"Like A Dog"	3:21

== Personnel ==
Throwing Muses

- Kristin Hersh – Lead vocals, guitar
- Bernard Georges – Bass
- David Narcizo – Drums

Production

- Art Direction, Design – Vaughan Oliver
- Co-producer, Engineer – Phill Brown (tracks: 1, 3, 4)
- Design [Assistant] – Stine Schyberg
- Engineer, Mixed By – Trina Shoemaker
