= The Fat Skier =

EP by Throwing Muses
- Released: 6 July 1987
- Recorded: December 1986 – April 1987
- Genre: Alternative rock
- Length: 25:32
- Label: 4AD (MAD706)
- Producer: Mark Van Hecke

Throwing Muses chronology
Chains Changed (1987)	The Fat Skier (1987)	House Tornado (1988)

Professional ratings
Review scores
Source	Rating
AllMusic	3.5/5 stars

The Fat Skier is a mini-album by Throwing Muses, released on 6 July 1987 on the 4AD label in the UK and licensed to Sire Records in the US. It played at 33 ⅓ RPM on the A-side (the first six tracks) and at 45 RPM on the B-side (a new version of "Soul Soldier", a song which first appeared on their debut album). It reached number two in the Independent Albums Chart in the UK.

== Track listing ==
All songs written by Kristin Hersh except where noted

1. "Garoux des Larmes" – 2:37
2. "Pools in Eyes" – 3:20 (Tanya Donelly)
3. "A Feeling" – 3:09
4. "Soap and Water" – 2:26
5. "And a She-Wolf After the War" – 3:31
6. "You Cage" – 1:41
7. "Soul Soldier" – 8:48

== Personnel ==
- Kristin Hersh – guitars, vocals
- Tanya Donelly – guitars, vocals
- Leslie Langston – bass
- David Narcizo – drums, percussion

=== Production ===
- Producer: Mark Van Hecke
- Engineer: Warren Bruleigh
- Mixing: Hideki Sunada for Mission Control
- Mastering: Greg Calbi
