= Limbo (Throwing Muses album) =

Studio album by Throwing Muses
- Released: August 13, 1996
- Recorded: January – May 1996
- Genre: Alternative rock
- Length: 46:58
- Label: 4AD, Rykodisc, Throwing Music
- Producer: Throwing Muses

Throwing Muses chronology
University (1995)	Limbo (1996)	Throwing Muses (2003)

Professional ratings
Review scores
Source	Rating
AllMusic	3.5/5 stars
Rolling Stone	3/5 stars

Limbo is the seventh studio album by the American alternative rock band Throwing Muses, released on Rykodisc in 1996. It was recorded at the New Orleans studio where the band had recorded University. Following a tour for the album, Throwing Muses were dissolved, with Kristin Hersh continuing her solo career and David Narcizo and Bernard Georges working on several personal and music projects including Hersh's. The album, engineered by Trina Shoemaker, also features cellist Martin McCarrick and Robert Rust on piano.

The album cover and liner notes drawings were done by Gilbert Hernandez.

== Track listing ==
All songs written by Kristin Hersh.

1. "Buzz" – 3:18
2. "Ruthie's Knocking" – 3:25
3. "Freeloader" – 3:28
4. "The Field" – 3:28
5. "Limbo" – 4:26
6. "Tar Kissers" – 3:07
7. "Tango" – 2:57
8. "Serene" – 2:49
9. "Mr. Bones" – 3:09
10. "Night Driving" – 4:57
11. "Cowbirds" – 3:53
12. "Shark" – 3:12

- "White Bikini Sand" (hidden track) – 3:32
