= House Tornado =

1988 studio album by Throwing Muses

Studio album by Throwing Muses
- Released: March 1988
- Recorded: December 1987–January 1988
- Studio: Fort Apache, Cambridge, MA
- Genre: Alternative rock, post-punk
- Length: 38:45; 55:31 (4AD CD version)
- Label: 4AD/Sire
- Producer: Gary Smith

Throwing Muses chronology
The Fat Skier (1987)	House Tornado (1988)	Hunkpapa (1989)

Singles from House Tornado
- 1. "Saving Grace" Released: March 1988

Alternative Cover
- Cover of the USA release

Professional ratings
Review scores
Source	Rating
AllMusic	3.5/5 stars
The Village Voice	C

House Tornado is the second studio album by the alternative rock band Throwing Muses. Produced by Gary Smith and engineered by Paul Q. Kolderie, it was recorded at Fort Apache Studios in Cambridge, MA. The album was released in 1988 internationally on the 4AD label, except in the United States, where it was released by Sire Records. Sire used a different album cover for its release, as the label was putting a strong promotional push behind the band, and label executives favored a picture of the band over the collage featured on the 4AD release.

The 4AD CD release also features six of the seven tracks from the band's 1987 EP The Fat Skier. (The seventh track was not deemed essential for CD release, as it was a re-issue of "Soul Soldier" from the band's debut album, followed by an ambient field recording of the band talking in a park.) The Sire release did not feature these six songs, and therefore these songs have never been released on CD in the US.

== Track listing ==
All songs written by Kristin Hersh except "The River" and "Giant" written by Tanya Donelly

1. "Colder" – 3:19
2. "Mexican Women" – 2:46
3. "The River" – 3:57
4. "Juno" – 2:03
5. "Marriage Tree" – 3:00
6. "Run Letter" – 5:02
7. "Saving Grace" – 2:38
8. "Drive" – 3:25
9. "Downtown" – 4:03
10. "Giant" – 3:53
11. "Walking in the Dark" – 4:39

Additional songs on the 4AD compact disc release, taken from the EP The Fat Skier. All songs written by Kristin Hersh except "Pools in Eyes" written by Tanya Donelly

12. "Garoux des larmes" – 2:37
13. "Pools in Eyes" – 3:20
14. "A Feeling" – 3:09
15. "Soap and Water" – 2:26
16. "And a She-Wolf After the War" – 3:31
17. "You Cage" – 1:41

== Personnel ==
Throwing Muses

- Kristin Hersh - guitars, vocals, piano
- Tanya Donelly - guitars, vocals, percussion
- Leslie Langston - bass, backing vocals, percussion
- David Narcizo - drums, backing vocals, percussion
