= Long, Long, Long =

1968 song by the Beatles

- Cover of the Apple Publishing sheet music

Song by the Beatles

from the album The Beatles
- Released: 22 November 1968
- Recorded: 7–9 October 1968
- Studio: EMI, London
- Genre: Psychedelic folk
- Length: 3:04
- Label: Apple
- Songwriter: George Harrison
- Producer: George Martin

"Long, Long, Long" is a song by the English rock band the Beatles from their 1968 album The Beatles (also known as "the White Album"). It was written by George Harrison, the group's lead guitarist, while he and his bandmates were attending Maharishi Mahesh Yogi's Transcendental Meditation course in Rishikesh, India, in early 1968. Although Harrison later stated that he was addressing God in the lyrics, it is the first of his compositions that invites interpretation as both a standard love song and a paean to his deity.

"Long, Long, Long" originated during a period in which Harrison emerged as a prolific songwriter, coinciding with his return to the guitar after two years of studying the Indian sitar. He based the chord pattern on "Sad Eyed Lady of the Lowlands" by Bob Dylan, while the song's understated arrangement partly reflects the influence of the Band's 1968 album Music from Big Pink. The Beatles recorded it in London towards the end of the White Album sessions, which were marked by acrimony among the band members in the aftermath of their experiences in Rishikesh. An ambient and meditative ballad, it ends with a partly improvised segment that was inspired by the sound of a wine bottle vibrating on a speaker in the studio.

"Long, Long, Long" has received praise from several music critics. On release, William Mann of The Times rated it the equal of the album's best Lennon–McCartney compositions; Ian MacDonald later described it as Harrison's "touching token of exhausted, relieved reconciliation with God" and his "finest moment on The Beatles". Elliott Smith and Jim James are among the other artists who have recorded or performed the song.

== Background and inspiration ==
George Harrison began writing "Long, Long, Long" during the Beatles' stay in Rishikesh, India, between February and April 1968. It was one of many songs that marked Harrison's return to the guitar as his principal musical instrument, after he had dedicated himself to mastering the Indian sitar in 1966. This coincided with a new, prolific period in his songwriting, which musicologist Walter Everett likens to the arrival of John Lennon and Paul McCartney as composers in 1963. (Note: Everett comments that Harrison was forced to remain "privately prolific" within the Beatles, however, and "stockpile" several of his compositions, as Lennon and McCartney continued to dominate the band's songwriting.)

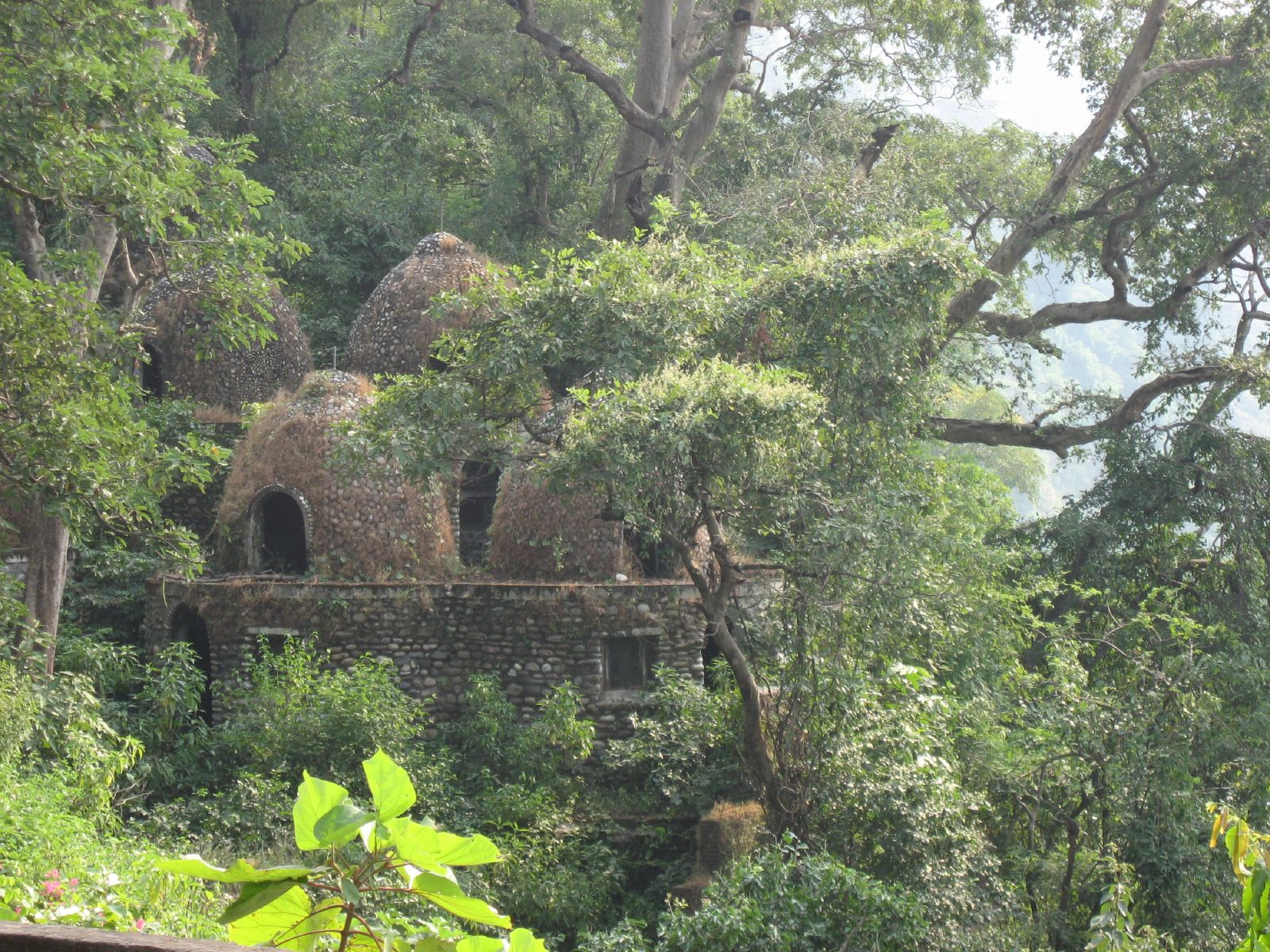
Meditation caves at Maharishi Mahesh Yogi's former ashram in Rishikesh, India. The Beatles' stay at the ashram in early 1968 served as part of Harrison's inspiration for the song.

Led by Harrison's commitment, the four band members went to Rishikesh to study Transcendental Meditation under Maharishi Mahesh Yogi. They departed for England separately, however, between 1 March and 12 April, and their mixed experiences on the course contributed to the divisiveness that pervaded the group upon their return. Harrison continued to espouse the Maharishi's teachings; this position left him isolated within the band and represented an impediment to their unity that was unprecedented in the group's career. Author Simon Leng describes "Long, Long, Long" as the first song in which Harrison "share[d] the spiritual refuge he'd found" through meditation, as well as "a confluence of the Indian, folk, and spiritual influences" that had preoccupied him since 1966.

Donovan, the Scottish singer-songwriter who joined in the Beatles' musical activities in Rishikesh, recalled that Harrison played both sitar and guitar at the ashram and was developing a style of music that became "the finest spiritual sound". Harrison completed the lyrics to "Long, Long, Long" in August that year, at which point the Beatles were part-way through the recording of their eponymous double album, also known as "the White Album". In his autobiography, I, Me, Mine, he states that "the 'you' in 'Long Long Long' is God." He also says that his musical inspiration for the composition was Bob Dylan's "Sad Eyed Lady of the Lowlands" – specifically, "D to E minor, A and D – those three chords and the way they moved". (Note: The only Western LP that Harrison took with him to Rishikesh was Dylan's Blonde on Blonde, which contains the eleven-minute "Sad Eyed Lady of the Lowlands".) As a further influence in "Long, Long, Long", Leng cites the release of the Band's debut album, Music from Big Pink, which "signaled the rebirth of 'the song'" as an alternative to the excesses of 1967-era psychedelia.

== Composition ==
According to musicologist Alan Pollack, "Long, Long, Long" is "an off-beat mixture" of contemporary musical styles; he identifies it as "a three-way cross between jazz waltz, folk song, and late sixties psychedelia". The song is in the key of F major, played with a capo on the guitar's third fret, so as to allow for the chord shapes that Harrison admired in "Sad Eyed Lady of the Lowlands". The melody appears to fluctuate from the home key, due to its avoidance of perfect cadences, as the dominant, C^{7} chord resists anchoring on the tonic I chord of F major. In addition, all plagal changes (in this case, B♭ to F major) are fleeting. The composition also makes use of jazz-style ninth chords.

["Long, Long, Long"] is the first of dozens of Harrison love songs that are ambiguous in that he could be singing either to his lady or to his Lord. "I think all love is part of a universal love," he explained to Rolling Stone years later. "When you love a woman, it's the God in her that you see."

— Nicholas Schaffner, 1977

Lyrically, the song takes the form of a reconciliation with a loved one after a long period of estrangement. Theologian Dale Allison considers that, given the "cryptic" nature of the lyrics, it is only through Harrison's subsequent comments that the listener knows that he is addressing God rather than a woman. (Note: The same ambiguity is prevalent in many of Harrison's love songs after "Long, Long, Long" and became a characteristic of his songwriting following the Beatles' break-up.) Allison likens the song's message to that of later Harrison compositions such as "Try Some, Buy Some" and "Heading for the Light", through its conveying of a "conversion experience".

The lyrics' reference to an extreme length of time is accentuated in the verses by the stretching out of a slow 6/8 metre into 9/8, and by the appending of a measure-long instrumental tag after each two bars of vocal melody. Partly as a result of the absence of resolution in the home key, the descending bassline in the verses – a 4–3–2–1 sequence of notes, mirroring the IV–iii–ii–I chord pattern – establishes an almost subliminal tonic. (Note: In the opinion of musicologist Dominic Pedler, a notable moment is the use of a minor triad 1st inversion on the words "long time". There, in the triad formula ♭3–5–1, the ♭3 note (B♭) is heard as the lowest note in the chord, which is described as a G minor/B♭ "slash" polychord.)

The mood of the song is gentle and meditative, with the more strident middle eight providing a brief departure from the calmness. In this section, Harrison sings of "So many tears I was searching / So many tears I was wasting", a statement that, according to author Ian Inglis, reflects the singer's "rejoicing in his discovery of a deity to guide him through the vicissitudes of life". Everett remarks on the close similarity between "Long, Long, Long" and "Sad Eyed Lady of the Lowlands", as well as an understated musical mood akin to the Band's early work. The song's ending, which would come about through happenstance while the Beatles were working in the recording studio, is marked by Harrison playing a final, G minor 7 chord, which author Ian MacDonald considers "one of the most resonant [chords] in The Beatles' discography". (Note: MacDonald writes of the chord's "simultaneous suggestion of a death, a new beginning, and an enigmatic question", and describes it as the minor equivalent of the "mighty opening" to "A Hard Day's Night".)

== Recording ==
The working title for the song was "It's Been a Long, Long, Long Time". Recording began at EMI Studios (now Abbey Road Studios) in London on 7 October 1968, during the final week of sessions for the White Album. Since the start of the project, in late May, the album sessions had been fraught with disharmony, partly as a result of the constant presence of Yoko Ono, Lennon's new partner, and disagreements within the band over their new business venture, Apple Corps. While noting the context of the song's recording, MacDonald describes "Long, Long, Long" as Harrison's "touching token of exhausted, relieved reconciliation with God".

There was a bottle of "Blue Nun" wine on top of the Leslie speaker during the recording and when our Paul hit some organ note the Leslie started vibrating and the bottle rattling. You can hear it on the record – at the very end.

— George Harrison, 1979

The recording session was a relaxed occasion; the burning of Indian incense helped to create the requisite atmosphere in the studio. The Beatles recorded 67 takes of the rhythm track, with Harrison on vocals and acoustic guitar, McCartney playing Hammond organ, and Ringo Starr on drums. (Note: Lennon did not attend several of the band's sessions that month, including those for Harrison's "Savoy Truffle" and McCartney's "Martha My Dear".) The drum part includes a series of loud fills that serve as a commentary beside the vocal line, in the manner of Starr's playing on "A Day in the Life" in 1967. The idea for the end of the song was inspired by the sound created by a wine bottle sitting on a Leslie speaker, through which the organ was connected. Whenever McCartney played a certain note on the keyboard, the bottle began to vibrate, producing an eerie clattering sound that the Beatles decided to incorporate in their subsequent performances of the track. To compound the effect on the selected take, Starr played a fast snare drum roll and Harrison vocalised a prolonged, high-pitched wail. Chris Gerard of PopMatters comments on the "palpable spiritual longing" conveyed in the song and describes this coda as a "weird spectral ending, with Harrison wailing like a wounded ghost while the band members rattle their instruments ominously". In his book on the history of ambient music, Mark Prendergast cites the song as a ballad "noteworthy for its Ambient production".

Nine hours after this all-night session, the band returned to the studio to carry out overdubs. Harrison added a second vocal and a lead acoustic guitar part that Everett likens to a sitar due to the use of natural distortion. During the same session, McCartney overdubbed bass guitar. The recording was finished on 9 October, with the addition of a brief harmony vocal from McCartney and piano, over the middle eight, played by Chris Thomas. Everett describes this as a "gospel piano" part that complements the "All Things Must Pass-style bridge" – referring to Harrison's 1970 solo album. (Note: In a 2018 interview with author Robert Rodriguez, Thomas recalled that Harrison asked him to play the part in the style of the Moody Blues' "Go Now".)

Mixing on "Long, Long, Long" was completed on 14 October, with Starr's drum fills given prominence in the mix. Relative to the stereo version, the contrast between the song's quiet and louder moments is less pronounced in the mono mix, where Harrison's second vocal part also arrives earlier on the opening line.

== Release and reception ==
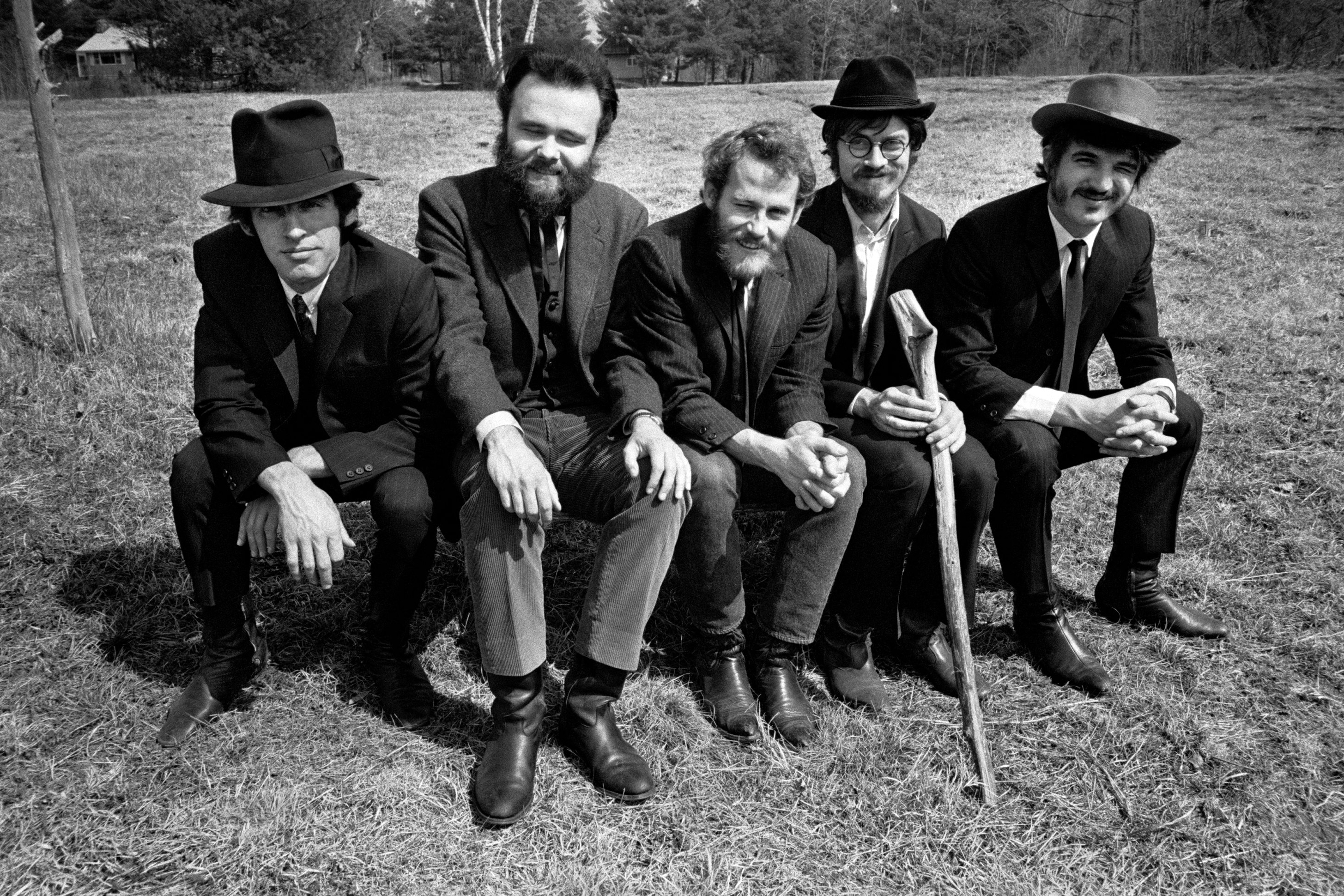
Having drawn inspiration from their music in "Long, Long, Long", Harrison visited the Band (pictured in 1969) and Bob Dylan in Woodstock in November 1968.

Apple Records released The Beatles on 22 November 1968, with "Long, Long, Long" appearing as the final track on side three of the double LP. The sequencing ensured that the song provided what author Mark Hertsgaard terms "a calm landing pad" after McCartney's heavy rock-styled "Helter Skelter". (Note: In his comments on the side-three sequencing, author and critic Tim Riley similarly writes of Harrison's guitar welcoming the listener to "Long, Long, Long" while "the smoke and ash are still settling from 'Helter Skelter'.") Shortly after the album's release, Harrison spent time with Dylan and the Band in Woodstock, in upstate New York. In addition to co-writing "I'd Have You Anytime" with Dylan, Harrison further established his independence from the Beatles during this visit, which music critic John Harris views as the foundation for All Things Must Pass.

Among contemporary reviews of The Beatles, Alan Walsh of Melody Maker admired the song as "a gentle, lilting track" while, less impressed, Record Mirror considered it "not a strong tune", with drums "monopolising the sound". In his review for The Times, William Mann described "Long, Long, Long" as "a melting love song in slow waltz tempo" and rated it the equal of the nine best, "superbly inventive" compositions credited to Lennon–McCartney.

Recalling the release in his 1977 book The Beatles Forever, Nicholas Schaffner said that in departing from the overtly Indian style of his previous compositions for the Beatles, Harrison had provided "a quartet of more conventionally accessible pop songs that many felt were among the finest on the [White Album]". Schaffner remarked on Harrison's limitations as a singer compared with Lennon and McCartney before adding: "but when he tones his voice down to an ethereal near-whisper, as in 'Long Long Long,' he can evoke as well as anyone the magic and the mystery of what [music journalist] Jonathan Cott has called 'the music of deep silence.'" In Newsweek's mainly unfavourable review of The Beatles, Hubert Saal concluded by saying that Harrison was the album's "hero" and that "Long, Long, Long" and "Savoy Truffle" were its best songs. He described the former as "deceptively simple, beautifully melodic and explosively punctuated".

== Retrospective assessment and legacy ==
AllMusic editor Stephen Thomas Erlewine views "Long, Long, Long" as "haunting" and, along with its composer's three other White Album tracks – "While My Guitar Gently Weeps", "Piggies" and "Savoy Truffle" – evidence that Harrison's songwriting "deserved wider exposure" than his typical quota of two songs on each Beatles LP. Less impressed with Harrison's other contributions to the album, Ian MacDonald welcomes "Long, Long, Long" with the words: "at last – the real George." MacDonald considers it to be "Harrison's finest moment on The Beatles: simple, direct, and, in its sighing, self-annihilating coda, devastatingly expressive". Conversely, although he acknowledges its effectiveness in following "Helter Skelter", Tim Riley identifies "Long, Long, Long" as the weakest of the four Harrison songs, which are otherwise all "essentials" and "regain[ed] the promise" shown by his three compositions on the Beatles' Revolver album. Author Jonathan Gould praises the track as a "dark beautiful ballad" and a "breakthrough" for Harrison as a vocalist and composer, since it represents "the first time he ever allowed himself to sound humbled by his emotions in a song". Music critic Chris Ingham, writing for Rough Guides, similarly includes it among "a new phase" of Harrison compositions, along with "Something" and "Here Comes the Sun", in which "warmth and sweetness" replaced the dissonant qualities of his Indian-inspired melodies.

Writing for Rolling Stone in 2002, Greg Kot deemed the song to be "quintessential Harrison, summarizing the impending exhaustion of the Beatles and the era they defined, while pointing the way toward the spiritual heights achieved by his solo debut masterpiece, All Things Must Pass". In his obituary of the former Beatle, for Rock's Backpages, Mat Snow included "Long, Long, Long" among his favourite Harrison compositions, saying: "for my money the music of George Harrison is most compelling when dwelling in those strange shadows of elusive regret and longing, even fear ..." David Quantick of Uncut admires it as "a yearning, beautiful song" and "an oasis of calm and faith in the clattering chaos of the White Album". He also considers the track to be "arguably the least feted of the Beatles' great songs".

"Long, Long, Long" was ranked 80th in Mojo's 2006 list "The 101 Greatest Beatles Songs". In his commentary for the magazine, musician Colin Newman described it as "achingly beautiful" and "like the album in microcosm ... [a] lament for a long-lost love which ends with a ghostly freakout". In a similar list, in 2011, Rolling Stone ranked the song at number 98. Conversely, in 2012, readers of The Daily Telegraph voted "Long, Long, Long" as the fifth worst Beatles track. The following year, Mojo listed it at number 9 in a poll to determine "the ultimate list of connoisseurs' Beatles' songs", as defined by any track not included on the band's greatest-hits compilations 1962–1966 and 1967–1970.

== Cover versions ==
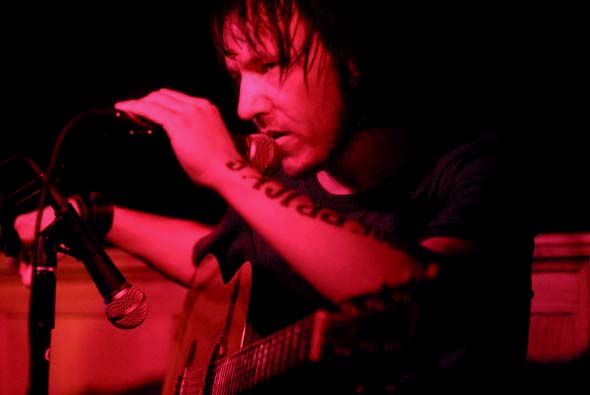
Elliott Smith, pictured at a concert in January 2003, covered the song in his live performances.

In 1987, Daniel Amos vocalist Terry Scott Taylor recorded what Trouser Press admired as a "first-rate cover" of "Long, Long, Long" for his album A Briefing for the Ascent. By contrast, Sean Carruthers of AllMusic considers singer Tom Hooper's 2002 cover to be a version that "manages to drain the life" out of the song. Elliott Smith included "Long, Long, Long" in his live performances. It was the last song he ever performed live. Smith biographer Benjamin Nugent writes that it appealed to Smith amid his struggles with depression and drug addiction, as "a ballad about trying to get rid of self-imposed suffering and returning to a place where you can relate to other people".

A recording by Tanya Donelly appeared on her 2006 album This Hungry Life and later on the CD accompanying Uncut's feature article on Harrison's career, in the August 2008 issue of the magazine. My Morning Jacket lead singer Jim James opened his 2009 EP of Harrison compositions, Tribute To, with "Long, Long, Long" – a cover that Drowned in Sound praised as "not only the standout moment, but also one of the most beautiful and arresting songs of the year". Having recorded the EP within days of Harrison's death in November 2001, James said he decided to release it eight years later partly as a result of attending the David Lynch Foundation's Transcendental Meditation awareness concert, "Change Begins Within", where "George's name came up a lot ... his spirit was very big at that event." (Note: McCartney and Starr also performed at Change Begins Within, as did Donovan, Mike Love and Paul Horn, all of whom had attended the Rishikesh retreat with the Beatles in 1968.)

== Personnel ==
According to Ian MacDonald:

The Beatles

- George Harrison – double-tracked lead vocal, acoustic guitars
- Paul McCartney – harmony vocal, Hammond organ, bass guitar
- Ringo Starr – drums

Additional musician

- Chris Thomas – piano

== Sources ==
- Allison, Dale C. Jr. (2006). The Love There That's Sleeping: The Art and Spirituality of George Harrison. New York, NY: Continuum. ISBN 978-0-8264-1917-0.
- Boyd, Pattie; with Junor, Penny (2007). Wonderful Today: The Autobiography. London: Headline Review. ISBN 978-0-7553-1646-5.
- Castleman, Harry; Podrazik, Walter J. (1976). All Together Now: The First Complete Beatles Discography 1961–1975. New York, NY: Ballantine Books. ISBN 0-345-25680-8.
- Doggett, Peter (2011). You Never Give Me Your Money: The Beatles After the Breakup. New York, NY: It Books. ISBN 978-0-06-177418-8.
- The Editors of Rolling Stone (2002). Harrison. New York, NY: Rolling Stone Press. ISBN 978-0-7432-3581-5.
- Everett, Walter (1999). The Beatles as Musicians: Revolver Through the Anthology. New York, NY: Oxford University Press. ISBN 0-19-512941-5.
- Everett, Walter (2009). "Any Time at All: The Beatles' free phrase rhythms". In Womack, Kenneth (ed.). The Cambridge Companion to the Beatles. Cambridge, UK: Cambridge University Press. ISBN 978-0-521-68976-2.
- Gould, Jonathan (2007). Can't Buy Me Love: The Beatles, Britain and America. London: Piatkus. ISBN 978-0-7499-2988-6.
- Greene, Joshua M. (2006). Here Comes the Sun: The Spiritual and Musical Journey of George Harrison. Hoboken, NJ: John Wiley & Sons. ISBN 978-0-470-12780-3.
- Harrison, George (2002) [1980]. I, Me, Mine. San Francisco, CA: Chronicle Books. ISBN 978-0-8118-5900-4.
- Hertsgaard, Mark (1996). A Day in the Life: The Music and Artistry of the Beatles. London: Pan Books. ISBN 0-330-33891-9.
- Ingham, Chris (2006). The Rough Guide to the Beatles (2nd edn). London: Rough Guides/Penguin. ISBN 978-1-84836-525-4.
- Inglis, Ian (2009). "Revolution". In Womack, Kenneth (ed.). The Cambridge Companion to the Beatles. Cambridge, UK: Cambridge University Press. ISBN 978-0-521-68976-2.
- Inglis, Ian (2010). The Words and Music of George Harrison. Santa Barbara, CA: Praeger. ISBN 978-0-313-37532-3.
- Lavezzoli, Peter (2006). The Dawn of Indian Music in the West. New York, NY: Continuum. ISBN 0-8264-2819-3.
- Leitch, Donovan (2005). The Autobiography of Donovan: The Hurdy Gurdy Man. New York, NY: St. Martin's Press. ISBN 978-0-312-35252-3.
- Leng, Simon (2006). While My Guitar Gently Weeps: The Music of George Harrison. Milwaukee, WI: Hal Leonard. ISBN 978-1-4234-0609-9.
- Lewisohn, Mark (2005) [1988]. The Complete Beatles Recording Sessions: The Official Story of the Abbey Road Years 1962–1970. London: Bounty Books. ISBN 978-0-7537-2545-0.
- MacDonald, Ian (1998). Revolution in the Head: The Beatles' Records and the Sixties. London: Pimlico. ISBN 978-0-7126-6697-8.
- Miles, Barry (2001). The Beatles Diary Volume 1: The Beatles Years. London: Omnibus Press. ISBN 0-7119-8308-9.
- Norman, Philip (1996) [1981]. Shout!: The Beatles in Their Generation. New York, NY: Fireside. ISBN 0-684-83067-1.
- Nugent, Benjamin (2005). Elliott Smith and the Big Nothing. Cambridge, MA: Da Capo Press. ISBN 978-0-306-81447-1.
- Paytress, Mark (2003). "A Passage to India". Mojo Special Limited Edition: 1000 Days of Revolution (The Beatles' Final Years – Jan 1, 1968 to Sept 27, 1970). London: Emap.
- Pedler, Dominic (2003). The Songwriting Secrets of the Beatles. London: Omnibus Press. ISBN 978-0-7119-8167-6.
- Prendergast, Mark (2003). The Ambient Century: From Mahler to Moby – The Evolution of Sound in the Electronic Age. New York, NY: Bloomsbury. ISBN 1-58234-323-3.
- Quantick, David (2002). Revolution: The Making of the Beatles' White Album. Chicago, IL: A Cappella Books. ISBN 1-55652-470-6.
- Riley, Tim (2002) [1988]. Tell Me Why – The Beatles: Album by Album, Song by Song, the Sixties and After. Cambridge, MA: Da Capo Press. ISBN 978-0-306-81120-3.
- Schaffner, Nicholas (1978). The Beatles Forever. New York, NY: McGraw-Hill. ISBN 0-07-055087-5.
- Shea, Stuart; Rodriguez, Robert (2007). Fab Four FAQ: Everything Left to Know About the Beatles ... and More!. New York, NY: Hal Leonard. ISBN 978-1-4234-2138-2.
- Tillery, Gary (2011). Working Class Mystic: A Spiritual Biography of George Harrison. Wheaton, IL: Quest Books. ISBN 978-0-8356-0900-5.
- Winn, John C. (2009). That Magic Feeling: The Beatles' Recorded Legacy, Volume Two, 1966–1970. New York, NY: Three Rivers Press. ISBN 978-0-307-45239-9.
- Womack, Kenneth (2014). The Beatles Encyclopedia: Everything Fab Four. Santa Barbara, CA: ABC-CLIO. ISBN 978-0-313-39171-2.
