= Lovesongs for Underdogs =

Studio album by Tanya Donelly
- Released: September 8, 1997
- Studio: Fort Apache (Cambridge, Massachusetts); Long View Farm (North Brookfield, Massachusetts)
- Genre: Alternative rock
- Length: 45:04
- Label: 4AD; Sire
- Producer: Tanya Donelly; Gary Smith

Tanya Donelly chronology
Lovesongs for Underdogs (1997)	Beautysleep (2002)

Singles from Lovesongs for Underdogs
- 1. "Pretty Deep" Released: August 18, 1997; 2. "The Bright Light" Released: November 24, 1997

Lovesongs for Underdogs is the solo debut album by American musician Tanya Donelly, who had formerly recorded with Throwing Muses, The Breeders, and Belly. It was released on September 8, 1997 and issued by 4AD and Sire Records.

== Release ==
Professional ratings
Review scores
Source	Rating
AllMusic	3/5 stars
Entertainment Weekly	B
The Guardian	2/5 stars
Los Angeles Times	2.5/4 stars
NME	4/10
Pitchfork	8.9/10
Q	2/5 stars
Rolling Stone	3/5 stars
Select	4/5
Uncut	4/5 stars

Lovesongs for Underdogs was released by Donelly's European label 4AD on September 8, 1997, while Sire Records issued the album in the United States the following day. It peaked at number 36 on the UK Albums Chart upon its release.

Two singles were released from Lovesongs for Underdogs: "Pretty Deep" on August 18, 1997, and "The Bright Light" on November 24, 1997. Both singles were issued in CD format in two parts, each including two newly-released B-sides. "Pretty Deep" featured "Spaghetti", "Morna", "These Days", and "Influenza", while "The Bright Light" featured "Bury My Heart", "How Can You Sleep", "Life on Sirius", and "Moon Over Boston". "Pretty Deep" and "The Bright Light" peaked at numbers 55 and 64 respectively on the UK Singles Chart. A music video for each single was produced and aired on VH1 and MTV2. Both videos differed highly in creative and artistic direction from previous Belly videos and exclusively featured Donelly solo, in movie-like settings.

== Track listing ==
All tracks are written by Tanya Donelly, except where noted.

1. "Pretty Deep" – 4:22
2. "The Bright Light" – 3:21
3. "Landspeed Song" – 3:34
4. "Mysteries of the Unexplained" – 4:52
5. "Lantern" – 3:10
6. "Acrobat" (Donelly, Dean Fisher) – 3:30
7. "Breathe Around You" – 2:56
8. "Bum" – 3:09
9. "Clipped" – 4:01
10. "Goat Girl" – 2:16
11. "Manna" – 5:26
12. "Swoon" – 4:27

== Personnel ==
Credits are adapted from the album's liner notes.

Musicians

- Tanya Donelly – vocals, guitar, keyboards, string arrangements
- Brian Clague – viola, violin
- Brother Cleve – string arrangement transcription
- Dean Fisher – bass, acoustic guitar, keyboards, accordion, percussion
- Rich Gilbert – guitar, baritone guitar, tiple, keyboards, accordion, saw
- Walter Halvorsen – cello
- Stacy Jones – drums
- David Lovering – drums
- Hilken Mancini – backing vocals
- David Narcizo – drums
- Chris Toppin – backing vocals
- Jonathan Williams – electric guitar

Production

- Tanya Donelly – production
- Matthew Ellard – engineering
- Wally Gagel – production, engineering, mixing
- Jesse Henderson – engineering (assistant)
- Suzanne Kapa – engineering (assistant)
- Dave Kirkpatrick – engineering (assistant)
- Paul Q. Kolderie – mixing
- Brian Lee – mastering
- Dan McLoughlin – engineering
- Carl Plaster – drum technician
- Sean Slade – mixing
- Gary Smith – production
- Kelly Wohlford – engineering (assistant)

Design

- Chris Bigg – design
- Andrew Catlin – photography

== Charts ==
Chart (1997)	Peak position
Scottish Albums (OCC)	54
UK Albums (OCC)	36
UK Independent Albums (OCC)	7
US Heatseekers Albums (Billboard)	20
