= Lakuna =

- Origin: Newport, Rhode Island, United States
- Genres: Instrumental; avant-garde; electronic; experimental electronic; electropop; synthpop; ambient; ambient pop; dream pop; art pop; experimental pop; post-rock
- Years active: 1996–2000
- Labels: 4AD, Throwing Music
- Spinoff of: Throwing Muses; Tanya Donelly (solo); Kristin Hersh (solo)
- Past members: David Narcizo (drums, drum machine, keyboards, synthesizer, programming, engineering, mixing); Bernard Georges (bass guitar); Kristin Hersh (guitar loops, tape loops, sampling, mixing); Tom Gorman (bass guitar); Melissa "Misi" Narcizo (keyboards, synthesizer, piano); Frank Gardner (bass guitar, synth-bass, synthesizer, sampler)

Lakuna was an electronic instrumental project begun by drummer David Narcizo after Throwing Muses first split up following their 1996 Limbo album. Lakuna first released a 12-inch called So Happy and then a 1999 full-length album called Castle of Crime. Narcizo provided drums, drum programming, and keyboards on all the tracks. The album's guest musicians included Bernard Georges on bass, Kristin Hersh on guitar loops, Belly's Tom Gorman on bass, Melissa "Misi" Narcizo on piano and keyboards, and Frank Gardner on bass and bass synthesizer. Narcizo employed tape loops and samples from obscure, vintage music to achieve the album's ambient-styled instrumental sounds. Lakuna recorded on the 4AD and Throwing Music labels.

== Discography ==
Castle of Crime (1999)
