= Purgatory/Paradise =

Studio album by Throwing Muses
- Released: October 29, 2013
- Recorded: March–July 2013
- Genre: Alternative rock
- Length: 67:29
- Label: It Books
- Producer: Throwing Muses

Throwing Muses chronology
Throwing Muses (2003)	Purgatory/Paradise (2013)	Sun Racket (2020)

Professional ratings
Review scores
Source	Rating
AllMusic	link
Pitchfork Media	8.0/10 link

Purgatory/Paradise is the ninth studio album by Throwing Muses. The album was released in the form of a book containing song lyrics, artwork and a code to download additional music. The album was named after Purgatory Road and Paradise Avenue, two roads that intersect in Middletown, Rhode Island.

== Track listing ==
All songs written by Kristin Hersh.

1. "Smoky Hands 1" – 1:09
2. "Morning Birds 1" – 3:27
3. "Sleepwalking 2" – 1:06
4. "Sunray Venus" – 3:35
5. "Cherry Candy 1" – 1:04
6. "Film" – 1:49
7. "Opiates" – 3:55
8. "Cherry Candy 2" – 0:55
9. "Freesia" – 2:42
10. "Curtains 1" – 1:07
11. "Triangle Quantico" – 1:15
12. "Morning Birds 2" – 2:00
13. "Lazy Eye" – 3:20
14. "Blurry 1" – 2:25
15. "Folding Fire 2" – 0:35
16. "Slippershell" – 4:47
17. "Bluff" – 1:01
18. "Blurry 2" – 1:32
19. "Terra Nova" – 2:37
20. "Walking Talking" – 1:03
21. "Milan" – 4:26
22. "Curtains 2" – 0:44
23. "Folding Fire 1" – 2:21
24. "Static" – 2:41
25. "Clark's Nutcracker" – 2:45
26. "Dripping Trees" – 1:48
27. "Sleepwalking 1" – 2:24
28. "Smoky Hands 2" – 0:28
29. "Speedbath" – 2:08
30. "Quick" – 2:34
31. "Dripping Trees 2" – 1:25
32. "Glass Cats" – 2:23

== Personnel ==
- Bernard Georges – bass guitar, production
- Kristin Hersh – guitars, vocals, piano, production
- David Narcizo – drums and percussion, production, art direction, design

Technical personnel

- Bhob Rainey – mixing
- Steve Rizzo – engineering
