= Chains Changed =

EP by Throwing Muses
- Released: January 1987
- Recorded: September–November 1986
- Genre: Alternative rock
- Length: 13:37
- Label: 4AD
- Producer: Gil Norton

Throwing Muses chronology
Throwing Muses (1986)	Chains Changed (1987)	The Fat Skier (1987)

Professional ratings
Review scores
Source	Rating
AllMusic	link

Chains Changed is an EP recording by Throwing Muses, released in 1987.

== Track listing ==
All songs written by Kristin Hersh except where noted

1. "Finished" – 3:51
2. "Reel" – 2:47 (Tanya Donelly)
3. "Snail Head" – 2:38
4. "Cry Baby Cry" – 4:24

== Personnel ==
- Kristin Hersh – vocals and guitars
- Tanya Donelly – vocals and guitars
- Leslie Langston – bass
- David Narcizo – drums and percussion

=== Production ===
- Producer: Gil Norton
