= The BibleCode Sundays =

UK musical group

- Also known as: Slainte
- Genre: Celtic rock
- Years active: 2006–present
- Members: Paddy Franklin; Enda Mulloy; Andy Nolan; Kian Chanter; Joe Cotterill
- Past members: Carlton Hunt (deceased); Joe Moran; Ronan MacManus; Adam Brown

The BibleCode Sundays are a London-based band often described as Celtic rock, folk music or rock music. Their sound fuses influences from a mixture of traditional Irish instruments and contemporary rock back line.

== History ==
The band was originally named Slainte. In 2006, they released an album called BibleCodeSundays of traditional Irish songs. The album's name refers to the Bible code and other conspiracy theories they discussed in the drink-fuelled conversations regularly held after Sunday gigs. Slainte was voted "Best Band on the London Circuit" 2006 in The Irish World awards. The band later changed its name to The BibleCode Sundays.

In 2007, the band recorded a second album of original material at Panic Studios, Park Royal, called Ghosts of Our Past. They signed to the Cosmic Trigger label in New York while on tour there promoting the album, and had several tours to the US afterwards. In 2008, the band recorded Boots or No Boots, touring extensively in Europe and the US to promote the album.

Following the success of both albums, the band played at the Glastonbury Festival at Celtic Park in Glasgow before several Glasgow Celtic F.C. matches and was the guest band on Sky Sports Soccer Saturday Christmas Special in a spoof of the X Factor programme called the Y Factor. The band supported the Dropkick Murphys at their homecoming gig in Boston on St. Patrick's Day in 2009. They also supported Van Morrison and Thin Lizzy at the London Feis in June 2011.

In 2011, the band released the EP The Pittsburgh Kid, followed on 22 November 2013 by a third album, New Hazardous Design. In spring 2014, they recorded Live Near Abbey Road.

"Count Your Blessings", a track from the New Hazardous Design album, was used on the Epix TV series Get Shorty and "Boys of Queens" was used as an epilogue in the US TV series Unforgettable.

In 2015, the band twice supported PiL at the O2 Indigo Arena in London.

In September 2017, the band released Walk Like Kings with special guests including Ronan MacManus's half-brother Elvis Costello, Russell Crowe and Matt McManamon (of The Dead 60s and the Specials). Other guests included Lorraine O'Reilly, Elly O'Keeffe and Keelta Higgins on vocals, with Tony Rico Richardson, Brian Kelly and Patrick Cassidy as guest musicians.

Carlton Hunt died suddenly on 3 November 2017.

On 14 January 2019, the band announced that the lead singer, Ronan MacManus, was leaving the band to pursue a "quieter more family-oriented life".

== Line up ==
- Paddy Franklin – fiddle
- Enda Mulloy – bass guitar and vocals
- Andy Nolan – accordion
- Kian Chanter – lead guitar and vocals
- Joe Cotterill – drums

== Discography ==
- Ghosts of Our Past – 2006
- Boots or No Boots – 2007
- The Pittsburgh Kid EP – 2011
- New Hazardous Design 2013
- Live Near Abbey Road 2014
- Walk Like Kings 2017
