= Red Heaven =

1992 studio album by Throwing Muses

Studio album by Throwing Muses
- Released: 1992
- Recorded: January–May 1992
- Studios: Fort Apache, Cambridge, Massachusetts; Power Station, New York City, New York
- Genre: Alternative rock
- Length: 39:56
- Labels: 4AD, Sire, Warner Bros.
- Producers: Throwing Muses, Steve Boyer

Throwing Muses chronology
The Real Ramona (1991)	Red Heaven (1992)	University (1995)

Singles from Red Heaven
- 1. "Firepile" Released: 1992

Red Heaven is a studio album by the American band Throwing Muses, released in 1992. It peaked at number 13 on the UK Albums Chart. Throwing Muses promoted the album by touring with the Flaming Lips. "Firepile" was released as a single.

== Production ==
The album was produced by Throwing Muses and Steve Boyer. It was the band's first album after the departure of Tanya Donelly. Bob Mould sings a duet with Kristin Hersh on "Dio". Hersh played a Kramer guitar on many of the songs.

== Critical reception ==
Professional ratings
Review scores
Source	Rating
AllMusic	3.5/5 stars
Calgary Herald	C
Chicago Tribune	2.5/4 stars
The Indianapolis Star	2.5/4 stars

The Calgary Herald opined that "Kristin Hersh's angry and powerful lyrics are silenced by sterile and emotionless music." The Orlando Sentinel noted that "the slow, creepy 'Carnival Wig' is an eerie cross between John Lurie's soundtrack work and Nick Cave-style blues." The Indianapolis Star wrote: "Despair, loneliness and anger seep through these songs, but catching a precise meaning in Hersh's opaque lyrics is like trying to snatch up a tadpole in a muddy creek."

NME named it the 38th best album of 1992.

== Track listing ==
All tracks are written by Kristin Hersh.

No.	Title	Length
1.	"Furious"	3:52
2.	"Firepile"	3:11
3.	"Dio"	2:51
4.	"Dirty Water"	3:37
5.	"Stroll"	0:58
6.	"Pearl"	5:36
7.	"Summer St."	2:16
8.	"Vic"	1:08
9.	"Backroad"	3:48
10.	"The Visit"	3:48
11.	"Dovey"	0:55
12.	"Rosetta Stone"	3:31
13.	"Carnival Wig"	4:11

The limited edition CD is a solo, live performance by Kristin Hersh

UK limited edition bonus CD: Live at Maxwell's Hoboken
No.	Title	Length
1.	"Juno"	2:48
2.	"Marriage Tree"	2:51
3.	"Pearl"	4:01
4.	"Stand Up / Dovey / Mexican Women"	3:40
5.	"Run Letter"	3:14
6.	"Soap & Water"	2:28
7.	"Rabbits Dying"	3:55
8.	"Cry Baby Cry"	3:16
9.	"Counting Backwards / Handsome Woman"	4:25
10.	"Take"	4:58
11.	"Soul Soldier"	3:13
12.	"Bea"	4:09
13.	"Delicate Cutters"	4:41

== Personnel ==
Credits adapted from liner notes.

Throwing Muses

- Kristin Hersh – guitars, vocals
- David Narcizo – drums, backing vocals

Additional musicians

- Leslie Langston – bass guitar
- Bob Mould – vocals on "Dio"

Technical personnel

- Throwing Muses – production
- Steve Boyer – production, engineering
- Paul Q. Kolderie – production assistance
- Artie Smith – production assistance
- Victor Deyglio – engineering assistance
- Howie Weinberg – mastering
- Christine Cano – package design, front cover artwork
- Kristin Hersh – front cover artwork
- David Narcizo – handwritten lyrics
- Michael Lavine – band photography

== Charts ==
Chart	Peak position
UK Albums (OCC)	13
