= Rat Girl =

2010 memoir by Kristin Hersh

- Cover of US edition
- Author: Kristin Hersh
- Language: English
- Subject: Autobiography
- Publisher: Penguin Books
- Publication date: 2010
- Publication place: United States
- Pages: 336
- ISBN: 0-14-311739-4

Rat Girl is a memoir published in 2010 by Penguin Books and written by Kristin Hersh, a guitarist, songwriter, and singer who has performed as a solo artist, and as guitarist/lead singer of the alternative rock band Throwing Muses. In the U.K., it was released with the alternate title Paradoxical Undressing.

== Synopsis ==
The book chronicles a year (1985–1986) in her life during which time Throwing Muses gained fame, signed a recording contract with 4AD, and recorded their eponymous debut album, Throwing Muses. Other notable subjects discussed at length in the work are Hersh's friendship with actress Betty Hutton, her much-publicized battle with a diagnosis of bipolar disorder and hospitalization, her pregnancy with her first child, and the experience of the band in the local music scenes in Providence, Rhode Island and Boston, Massachusetts at the time.

The book provides further insight into Hersh's songwriting process, the internal dynamics within Throwing Muses in its first incarnation, and Hersh's childhood, including interaction with poet Allen Ginsberg and mythologist Joseph Campbell.

== Reception ==
Rat Girl was greeted warmly by critics upon release. Rob Sheffield described it in The New York Times Sunday Book Review as "Sensitive and emotionally raw… it’s also wildly funny". In a starred review in Kirkus Reviews it is described as a "thoroughly engrossing work by an original voice".

In 2012 Rolling Stone ranked it number 8 in their list of The 25 Greatest Rock Memoirs of All Time.
