= The Dead 60s (album) =

Studio album by The Dead 60s
- Released: 31 May 2005
- Recorded: The Ranch, Liverpool and Parr Street Studios, Liverpool
- Genre: Ska punk
- Length: 38:19
- Labels: Deltasonic (UK); Epic (US)
- Producer: Central Nervous System

The Dead 60s chronology
| The Dead 60s (2005) | Time to Take Sides (2007) |

Alternative Cover
- UK cover

Singles from The Dead 60s
- 1. "You're Not the Law" Released: 10 May 2004; 2. "Riot Radio" Released: 4 October 2004; 3. "The Last Resort" Released: 28 March 2005; 4. "Loaded Gun" Released: 13 June 2005; 5. "Riot Radio (re-release)" Released: 12 September 2005; 6. "Ghostfaced Killer" Released: 21 November 2005

Professional ratings
Review scores
| Source | Rating |
|---|---|
| Allmusic | 3/5 stars |
| Blender | 3/5 stars |
| The Guardian | 4/5 stars |
| Q Magazine | 3/5 stars |
| Pitchfork | {5.8/10} |
| PopMatters | (7/10) |
| Sputnikmusic | 4/5 stars |
| TMZ.com | 1.5/5 stars |

The Dead 60s is the self-titled debut studio album by British rock band The Dead 60s. It was first released in the United States on 31 May 2005. The office building on the album cover is Concourse House, which once stood next to Liverpool Lime Street railway station. It was demolished as part of a regeneration of the area surrounding the station.

== Track listings ==
All tracks written by The Dead 60s.

US version ('Yellow Album')

1. "Riot Radio" – 2:22
2. "A Different Age" – 1:33
3. "Nowhere" – 3:13
4. "Red Light" – 3:07
5. "Just Another Love Song" – 3:10
6. "Control This" – 2:40
7. "Loaded Gun" – 2:47
8. "Nationwide" – 2:19
9. "We Get Low" – 3:41
10. "Horizontal" – 1:56
11. "New Town Disaster" – 3:08
12. "The Last Resort" – 2:54
13. "You're Not the Law" – 2:53
  Bonus tracks on the Japan CD:
14. "Control This" [Dub]
15. "TV & Magazines"
16. "Cold Soul"

UK version ('Red Album')

1. "Riot Radio"
2. "A Different Age"
3. "Train to Nowhere"
4. "Red Light"
5. "We Get Low"
6. "Ghostfaced Killer"
7. "Loaded Gun"
8. "Control This"
9. "Soul Survivor"
10. "Nationwide"
11. "Horizontal"
12. "The Last Resort"
13. "You're Not the Law"

"Space Invader" Bonus Dub Album (by Central Nervous System)

1. "Too Much TV Dub"
2. "Invader Dub"
3. "D-60 Fights the Evil Force"
4. "No Control Dub"
5. "Tower Block Dub"
6. "CNS Lazer Attack D-60"
7. "Police Radio Dub"
8. "Flight Mission Dub"
9. "No Good Town Dub"
10. "Game Over"

Bonus DVD
A bonus, 3-video DVD was given out with initial sales of the American CD at indie record shops, and was also distributed at US gigs. It includes the music videos for the band's first 2 singles, plus a video montage of their Japan tour.

1. "Riot Radio"
2. "You're Not the Law"
3. "Japan in Dub"

"Riot Radio" is featured on the soundtrack of the video game Burnout Revenge and also on the soundtrack of the film Nick and Norah's Infinite Playlist

== Album release details ==
| Country | Date | Label | Format | Cover Colour | Catalog number |
|---|---|---|---|---|---|
| US | 31 May 2005 | Epic | CD (with XCP) | Yellow | EK94453 |
| Japan | 8 Jun 2005 | Sony Music Japan | CD (Limited Edition) | Yellow | EICP517 |
| Japan | 10 Aug 2005 | Sony Music Japan | CD | Yellow | EICP548 |
| Germany | 23 Sep 2005 | Deltasonic | CD | Red | DLTCD038 |
| UK | 26 Sep 2005 | Deltasonic | CD | Red | DLTCD038 |
| UK | 26 Sep 2005 | Deltasonic | 2CD | Red | DLTCDLE038 |
| UK | 26 Sep 2005 | Deltasonic | 2LP | Red | DLTLPLE038 |
| US | 22 Nov 2005 | Epic | CD (without XCP) | Yellow | 82876776752 |
| Japan | 21 Dec 2005 | Sony Music Japan | 2CD | Red | EICP586~7 |
| Germany | 16 Mar 2007 | Deltasonic | CD (re-release) | Red | |

== Extended Copy Protection ==
In November 2005, it was revealed that the US CD contained Extended Copy Protection (XCP), a controversial feature that automatically installed rootkit software on any Microsoft Windows machine upon insertion of the disc. The CD was withdrawn and a new version without XCP was issued on 22 November 2005.

== UK LP ==
Another product-related problem for the band was the mis-pressing of the UK vinyl album, which lists on both the label and sleeve the same track listing as the UK CD, but in fact plays the track listing of the US version. The LP was re-pressed and distributed with the same catalogue number. The original issue has a blue starburst sticker on the cover, and the reissue does not.

== German re-release ==
In 2007 the album was re-released to include a remix of the song "Ghostfaced Killer". This version was used as the title track for the German comedy film Neues vom Wixxer.

== Singles ==
| Name | Released | Producer | Chart position |
|---|---|---|---|
| "You're Not the Law" | 10 May 2004 | | Did not chart |
"You're Not the Law" was the first single off the album and was released in limited edition. 1,000 copies of each format were sold.
| "Riot Radio" | 4 October 2004 | | #30 (UK) |
This is the official second single from the album. It was re-released later in 2005 again. The 7" single came signed. It charted at No. 30 and dropped to No. 59 in the next week.
| "The Last Resort" | 28 March 2005 | Central Nervous System | #24 (UK) |
The third single off the album. It's their highest peaking single from the whole album. It charted at No. 24 in the UK and dropped to No. 49 the next week, dropping out of the chart after.
| "Loaded Gun" | 13 June 2005 | | #28 (UK) |
The single was the fourth single off the album. It charted at No. 28 in the UK and dropped to No. 61 in the next week.
| "Riot Radio" (re-release) | 12 September 2005 | | #30 (UK) |
The "Riot Radio" singles was re-released in 2005 after gaining some recognition. However the recognition, the singles charted at No. 30 in the UK again and dropped to No. 58 in the next week, almost the same as the original single.
| "Ghostfaced Killer" | 21 November 2005 | Central Nervous System | #25 (UK) |
It was officially not on the original album, however later included on the red coloured album.

== Charts ==
Chart performance for The Dead 60s
| Chart (2005) | Peak position |
|---|---|
| French Albums (SNEP) | 97 |
| Scottish Albums (Official Charts) | 23 |
| UK Albums (Official Charts) | 23 |
| Chart (2025) | Peak position |
| UK Independent Albums (Official Charts) | 32 |
