= University (album) =

Studio album by Throwing Muses
- Released: January 16, 1995
- Recorded: October 1993–October 1994
- Studios: Kingsway, New Orleans, LA
- Genre: Alternative rock
- Length: 48:32
- Labels: 4AD; Sire/Reprise
- Producer: Throwing Muses

Throwing Muses chronology
Red Heaven (1992)	University (1995)	Limbo (1996)

University is the sixth studio album by the American alternative rock band Throwing Muses, released in January 1995. It contains the single "Bright Yellow Gun", the band's first national hit.

The album peaked at No. 10 on the UK Albums Chart; it peaked at No. 10 on Billboard's Heatseekers Albums chart. Sales were too low for Sire, and the band was dropped from its roster, ending the Muses' major label years.

== Production ==
The album was recorded in the fall of 1993, right before lead Muse Kristin Hersh recorded her first solo album, Hips and Makers. 4AD founder Ivo Watts-Russell convinced Hersh to release the solo album first, in early 1994; University was delayed until 1995. The band's former roadie, Bernard Georges, played bass on the album.

== Critical reception ==
Professional ratings
Review scores
Source	Rating
AllMusic	4.5/5 stars
The Encyclopedia of Popular Music	4/5 stars
Entertainment Weekly	B+
Knoxville News Sentinel	4/5 stars
Rolling Stone	4/5 stars

The Independent called University "a gorgeous album in parts: it's the most tuneful, coherent and least witchy music Hersh has yet delivered in her Muses hat." The Knoxville News Sentinel deemed "Bright Yellow Gun" a "too-traditional rocker." The Boston Globe determined that the album "finds the band and Hersh in good, raw form, mixing up formally inventive songs with sidelong hooks and expressionistic lyrics."

== Track listing ==
All songs by Kristin Hersh.

1. "Bright Yellow Gun" – 3:43
2. "Start" – 2:47
3. "Hazing" – 3:14
4. "Shimmer" – 3:14
5. "Calm Down, Come Down" – 1:48
6. "Crabtown" – 4:20
7. "No Way in Hell" – 4:44
8. "Surf Cowboy" – 2:45
9. "That's All You Wanted" – 3:26
10. "Teller" – 2:52
11. "University" – 2:12
12. "Snakeface" – 3:29
13. "Flood" – 3:14
14. "Fever Few" – 6:44
