= Think Tree =

Think Tree was a band formed in Boston in the mid-1980s. They first performed in Boston in 1987 and their latest and presumably last performance was in May 1993. The band members included Peter Moore, Will Ragano, Paul Lanctot, Krishna Venkatesh, and Jeff Biegert. They released "Hire a Bird" as a 12" single in 1989, "Eight / Thirteen", which included "Hire a Bird", in 1990, and "Like the Idea" in 1991. "Hire a Bird" was included on Boston radio station WFNX's top 500 songs of all time, published in 1999. Peter Moore, Will Ragano, and Jeff Beigert went on to form the Boston-based band Count Zero, while Krishna Venkatesh went on to form El Dopa.

== Album List ==
- Eight/Thirteen 1990. Caroline Records
- Like The Idea 1991. Caroline 5

== Singles ==
- "Hire A Bird" - 1989 - 12" EP - Uncle Records
- "Eight/ Thirteen" 1990. CD EP 7×File, FLAC, EP, RE - SineAppleSap
- "Rattlesnake" 1992 CD, Single, Promo - Caroline Records
- "Abbreviated" 1992 Single, CD, Promo - Caroline Records
