= Matt McManamon =

English musician

- Born: Liverpool, England
- Occupations: Singer-songwriter, guitarist
- Years active: 1997-Present
- Labels: Deltasonic, Columbia, Epic, Sony BMG, Late Developer Recordings, Fretsore Records

Matt McManamon is a Liverpool-born singer-songwriter and guitarist most known for his role as lead singer for The Dead 60s. McManamon has also played lead guitar for The Specials, and has toured and recorded with artists including The BibleCode Sundays, Supergrass, the Boo Radleys and Holly Johnson.

He recorded and released his first solo album, 'Scally Folk' to critical acclaim on 28th May 2021 via independent London-based boutique record label ‘Fretsore Records’.

== Personal ==
Matt was born to Liverpool/Irish parents. His mother Mary is from Bangor Erris, County Mayo, Ireland, and his father William (Billy) Chang, himself born to an Irish mother, is from Granby, Toxteth in Liverpool. Matt was educated in Merchant Taylors School For Boys in Liverpool. Shortly after leaving school he signed to the Deltasonic label, before joining Sony Records. He is married to Ann (nee Gallagher) and they have three children, Thomas, Mary-Phoebe (Fairy)) and Matthew Jnr. They live in the village of Mulranny in Co. Mayo, Ireland.

=== Studio albums ===
- 2021 – Scally Folk (Fretsore Records)
- 2022 – Scally Folk Extended Edition (Fretsore Records)

=== Singles ===
- 2019 - “Seas Of Gold” (Late Developer Recordings)
- 2019 - “Sinking Sands” (Late Developer Recordings)
- 2020 - “Goodbye” (Fretsore Records)
- 2020 - “Pulling At The Reins” (Fretsore Records)
- 2021 - “Jumpin’ The Gun” (Fretsore Records)
- 2021 - “Every Time I Close My Eyes” (Fretsore Records)
- 2021 - “Mulranny Smile” (Fretsore Records)
- 2022 - “Out Of The Cold" (Fretsore Records)
- 2022 - "Step Into My Heart" (Fretsore Records)
- 2023 - "Circles In The Sky" (Fretsore Records)
- 2024 - "Told You Before (I Won't Tell You Again)" (Fretsore Records)
