= This Hungry Life =

Studio album by Tanya Donelly
- Released: October 17, 2006
- Recorded: Live at The Windham, August 2004
- Genre: Alternative rock
- Label: Eleven Thirty Records

Tanya Donelly chronology
Whiskey Tango Ghosts (2004)	This Hungry Life (2006)

Professional ratings
Review scores
Source	Rating
AllMusic	3.5/5 stars
The Austin Chronicle	4/5 stars
Classic Rock	7/10
The Guardian	4/5 stars
Hot Press	7/10
No Depression	(mixed)

This Hungry Life is the fourth solo album by American singer-songwriter Tanya Donelly, released in 2006. The album was recorded live in front of an audience at a closed hotel in Bellows Falls, Vermont in August 2004.

== Track listing ==
All songs by Tanya Donelly, except where noted.

1. "New England" – 4:01
2. "World on Fire" – 3:39
3. "Kundalini Slide" (Donelly, Dean Fisher) – 4:18
4. "This Hungry Life" – 6:13
5. "Littlewing" – 4:01
6. "To the Lighthouse" – 2:38
7. "Invisible One" – 4:11
8. "Days of Grace" (Donelly, Dean Fisher) – 4:32
9. "Long Long Long" (George Harrison) – 4:58
10. "River Girls" (Donelly, Dean Fisher) – 3:58

== Personnel ==
- Tanya Donelly – guitar, vocals
- Dean Fisher – guitars
- Rich Gilbert – pedal steel, guitar
- Joan Wasser – violin, viola
- Joe McMahon – upright bass
- Arthur Johnson – drums
- Bill Janovitz – vocals

== Production ==
- Engineer: Brian Brown
- Edited by: Dean Fisher and Brian Brown
- Mixing: Paul Kolderie
- Mixing engineer: Adam Taylor
- Photography: Richard Donelly and Christopher Donelly
- Artwork: Hamilton Hughes Design
