= Stood Up =

Stood Up may refer to:

- "Stood Up" (song), a song by Ricky Nelson
- "Stood Up", a song by John Hiatt from Bring the Family

== See also ==
- Stand Up (disambiguation)
