= Beautysleep =

Studio album by Tanya Donelly
- Released: February 18, 2002
- Studio: Fort Apache (Cambridge, Massachusetts)
- Genre: Alternative rock
- Length: 49:23
- Label: 4AD; Beggars Banquet
- Producer: Tanya Donelly; Matthew Ellard; Dean Fisher

Tanya Donelly chronology
Lovesongs for Underdogs (1997)	Beautysleep (2002)	Whiskey Tango Ghosts (2004)

Beautysleep is the second studio album by American musician Tanya Donelly. It was released on February 18, 2002 and issued by 4AD and Beggars Banquet Records.

== Release ==
Professional ratings
Aggregate scores
Source	Rating
Metacritic	67/100
Review scores
Source	Rating
AllMusic	4/5 stars
Blender	3/5 stars
Chicago Sun-Times	3/4 stars
The Guardian	3/5 stars
The Independent	3/5 stars
Now	4/5
Pitchfork	6.9/10
Q	2/5 stars
Slant Magazine	4/5 stars
Uncut	4/5 stars

Beautysleep was released by the label 4AD on February 18, 2002. In the United States, it was co-released by Beggars Banquet Records the following day. Preceding the album's release, the EP Sleepwalk was issued on November 19, 2001. Upon release, Beautysleep peaked at number 88 on the UK Albums Chart.

A music video was produced for the track "Keeping You", which was included as bonus enhanced content on the US issue of Beautysleep. "The Night You Saved My Life" was also released to US adult album alternative radio.

== Track listing ==
All tracks are written by Tanya Donelly, except where noted.

1. "Life Is but a Dream" – 2:47
2. "The Storm" – 4:03
3. "The Night You Saved My Life" (Donelly, Dean Fisher) – 3:59
4. "Keeping You" – 4:20
5. "Moonbeam Monkey" – 3:47
6. "Wrap-Around Skirt" – 3:33
7. "Another Moment" – 4:33
8. "Darkside" (Donelly, Fisher) – 3:50
9. "So Much Song" – 4:38
10. "The Wave" (Donelly, Fisher) – 4:04
11. "The Shadow" (Donelly, Fisher) – 3:57
12. "Head for Math" – 3:48 (hidden track starts 5:57 into "The Shadow")

== Personnel ==
Credits are adapted from the album's liner notes.

Musicians

- Tanya Donelly – vocals, guitar, acoustic guitar, EBow, keyboards, organ, piano, wind
- Gracie Bee – glockenspiel, toy piano
- Poppy Ellard – vocals
- Dean Fisher – bass, guitar, acoustic guitar, electric guitar, Moog pedal, keyboards, organ, drums, shaker, triangle
- Rich Gilbert – guitar, acoustic guitar, electric guitar, slide guitar, autoharp, keyboards, organ
- Hilken Mancini – vocals
- David Narcizo – drums, tambourine
- Mark Sandman – vocals
- Elizabeth Steen – organ, piano, accordion
- Chris Toppin – vocals, backing vocal arrangement

Production

- Tanya Donelly – production
- Brian Brown – engineering
- Matthew Ellard – production, engineering, mixing
- Dean Fisher – production
- Bob Ludwig – mastering

Design

- Chris Bigg – design, illustrations
- Dana Tynan – portraits

== Charts ==
Chart (2002)	Peak position
Scottish Albums (OCC)	82
UK Albums (OCC)	88
UK Independent Albums (OCC)	14
