= Whiskey Tango Ghosts =

Studio album by Tanya Donelly
- Released: July 26, 2004
- Genre: Alternative rock
- Length: 39:21
- Label: 4AD

Tanya Donelly chronology
Beautysleep (2002)	Whiskey Tango Ghosts (2004)	This Hungry Life (2006)

Professional ratings
Review scores
Source	Rating
Allmusic	link
Rolling Stone	link

Whiskey Tango Ghosts is the third solo album by Tanya Donelly, released in 2004. The album marks a departure from Donelly's previous pop work in favor of a country and folk-influenced sound. Donelly has described the album as influenced by "a horrible war, a horrible administration, (and) a bleak, mean winter."

== Track listing ==
All songs by Tanya Donelly, except where noted

1. "Divine Sweet Divide" – 3:25
2. "Every Devil" – 3:06
3. "Whiskey Tango" (Donelly, Dean Fisher) – 3:11
4. "Just in Case You Quit Me" – 3:27
5. "Butterfly Thing" (Donelly, Fisher) – 3:21
6. "My Life as a Ghost" (Donelly, Fisher) – 3:41
7. "The Center" (Donelly, Fisher) – 3:26
8. "Golden Mean" – 4:15
9. "The Promise" – 3:04
10. "Story High" – 4:20
11. "Fallout" – 3:28
12. "Dona Nobis Pacem" (Hidden / Uncredited Track)* – 0:37
- "Dona Nobis Pacem" (which translates to "Give Us Peace") is a traditional Latin hymn.

== Personnel ==
- Tanya Donelly – guitar, vocals
- Dean Fisher – bass, guitar, percussion, drums
- Rich Gilbert – guitar, pedal steel
- David Narcizo – drums
- Elizabeth Steen – piano, vocals, Wurlitzer

== Production ==
- Engineers: Matt Beaudoin, Matthew Ellard
- Assistant engineer: Matt Tahaney
- Mixing: Matthew Ellard
- Mastering: Steve Rooke
- Photography: Richard Donelly
- Cover photo: Chris Hosford
- Cover painting: Kristen Hughes
