= Hunkpapa (album) =

Studio album by Throwing Muses
- Released: January 23, 1989
- Recorded: June–October 1988
- Studio: Fort Apache, Cambridge, Massachusetts
- Genre: Alternative rock
- Length: 38:48
- Label: 4AD, Sire
- Producer: Gary Smith

Throwing Muses chronology
House Tornado (1988)	Hunkpapa (1989)	The Real Ramona (1991)

Singles from Hunkpapa
- 1. "Dizzy" Released: February 13, 1989

Hunkpapa is the third studio album by Throwing Muses, released in 1989. It peaked at number 59 on the UK Albums Chart.

== Critical reception ==
Professional ratings
Review scores
Source	Rating
AllMusic	2.5/5 stars
Robert Christgau	B−
The Encyclopedia of Popular Music	2/5 stars
MusicHound Rock: The Essential Album Guide	3.5/5 stars
The Rolling Stone Album Guide	3.5/5 stars
Spin Alternative Record Guide	8/10

Trouser Press called the album "a chilly and dull record that could be by any number of contempo jangle-pop bands," and said that lead singer Kristin Hersh’s voice, "no longer possessing any strong character, is ineffectual and a bit strident at times." The New York Times wrote that the band "have edged toward rock convention." The Rolling Stone Album Guide praised the "stronger sense of groove." Robert Christgau described the album as "an evolution from bad poetry to obscure poetry--an improvement, definitely, but not the difference that will make the difference."

NME named it the 33rd best album of 1989.

== Track listing ==
All tracks are written by Kristin Hersh, except "Dragonhead" and "Angel" by Tanya Donelly.

No.	Title	Length
1.	"Devil's Roof"	3:39
2.	"Bea"	4:18
3.	"Dizzy"	3:41
4.	"No Parachutes"	3:17
5.	"Dragonhead"	4:04
6.	"Say Goodbye"	0:37
7.	"Fall Down"	3:40
8.	"I'm Alive"	2:49
9.	"Angel"	3:24
10.	"Mania"	3:02
11.	"The Burrow"	1:20
12.	"Take"	4:57

CD edition bonus track
No.	Title	Length
13.	"Santa Claus"	3:47

== Personnel ==
Credits adapted from liner notes.

Throwing Muses

- Kristin Hersh – guitar, piano, vocals
- Tanya Donelly – guitar, vocals
- Leslie Langston – bass guitar, vocals
- David Narcizo – drums, percussion, vocals

Additional musicians

- Bernie Worrell – keyboards
- Russ Gershon – tenor saxophone
- Tom Halter – trumpet, flugelhorn
- Russell Jewell – trombone
- Guy Yarden – violin

Technical personnel

- Gary Smith – production
- Steve Haigler – engineering
- Matt Lane – engineering assistance
- Phil Magnotti – engineering assistance
- Greg Calbi – mastering

== Charts ==
Chart	Peak position
UK Albums (OCC)	59
