= In a Doghouse =

Compilation album by Throwing Muses
- Released: September 14, 1998
- Genre: Rock
- Length: 100:58
- Label: 4AD Records

Throwing Muses chronology
Freeloader (1997)	In a Doghouse (1998)	Live in Providence (2001)

Professional ratings
Review scores
Source	Rating
AllMusic	4.5/5 stars
Melody Maker	3/5 stars

In a Doghouse is a compilation album of Throwing Muses' early music. It was released as a double CD in 1998. The title refers to their 1985 self-distributed The Doghouse Cassette.

== Track listing ==
=== Disc one ===
Throwing Muses (1986)

1. "Call Me" – 3:58
2. "Green" – 3:04
3. "Hate My Way" – 4:05
4. "Vicky's Box" – 5:08
5. "Rabbits Dying" – 3:48
6. "America" – 2:46
7. "Fear" – 2:44
8. "Stand Up" – 2:56
9. "Soul Soldier" – 5:10
10. "Delicate Cutters" – 3:54

Chains Changed EP (1987)

11. "Finished" – 3:50
12. "Reel" – 2:47
13. "Snail Head" – 2:37
14. "Cry Baby Cry" – 4:23

=== Disc two ===
The Doghouse Cassette (1985)

1. "Call Me" – 4:06
2. "Sinkhole" – 2:33
3. "Green" – 3:22
4. "Hate My Way" – 3:53
5. "Vicky's Box" – 5:11
6. "America (She Can't Say No)" – 2:44
7. "Fear" – 3:03
8. "Raise The Roses" – 3:45
9. "And A She Wolf After The War" – 3:15
10. "Fish" – 4:43

Written in 1983 recorded in 1996

11. "Catch" – 3:03
12. "Lizzie Sage" – 3:26
13. "Clear And Great" – 2:47
14. "Doghouse" – 1:32
15. "People" – 2:25

This CD is enhanced with the "Fish" video in QuickTime format.
