= The Real Ramona =

1991 studio album by Throwing Muses

Studio album by Throwing Muses
- Released: March 12, 1991
- Recorded: July–November 1990
- Studios: London, Los Angeles, California; Dust Bowl, Los Angeles, California
- Genres: Alternative rock; art pop
- Length: 40:10
- Labels: 4AD, Sire
- Producer: Dennis Herring

Throwing Muses chronology
| Hunkpapa (1989) | The Real Ramona (1991) | Red Heaven (1992) |

Singles from The Real Ramona
- 1. "Counting Backwards" Released: January 28, 1991; 2. "Not Too Soon" Released: November 4, 1991

The Real Ramona is the fourth studio album by Throwing Muses, released in 1991. It peaked at number 26 on the UK Albums Chart.

== Reception ==
Professional ratings
Review scores
| Source | Rating |
|---|---|
| AllMusic | 4.5/5 stars |
| Chicago Tribune | 3/4 stars |
| Entertainment Weekly | C+ |
| Los Angeles Times | 3.5/5 stars |
| NME | 8/10 |
| Q | 4/5 stars |
| Rolling Stone | 4/5 stars |
| Select | 5/5 |
| Sounds | 5/5 stars |
| Spin Alternative Record Guide | 7/10 |

NME named The Real Ramona the 35th best album of 1991. In a retrospective review, Andrzej Lukowski of BBC Music wrote that, with The Real Ramona, Throwing Muses wrote an "album of great pop songs, but when they did so, they [in] no way surrendered their intrinsic otherness – two decades of indie-pop later, it still sounds arresting.

== Track listing ==
All tracks are written by Kristin Hersh, except where noted.

| No. | Title | Length |
|---|---|---|
| 1. | "Counting Backwards" | 3:15 |
| 2. | "Him Dancing" | 1:10 |
| 3. | "Red Shoes" | 3:33 |
| 4. | "Graffiti" | 2:37 |
| 5. | "Golden Thing" | 2:25 |
| 6. | "Ellen West" | 2:49 |
| 7. | "Dylan" | 1:40 |
| 8. | "Hook in Her Head" | 6:32 |
| 9. | "Not Too Soon" (Tanya Donelly) | 3:09 |
| 10. | "Honeychain" (Tanya Donelly) | 4:24 |
| 11. | "Say Goodbye" | 3:54 |
| 12. | "Two Step" (Throwing Muses) | 4:34 |

== Personnel ==
Credits adapted from liner notes.

Throwing Muses

- Kristin Hersh – guitars, vocals
- Tanya Donelly – guitars, vocals
- Fred Abong – bass guitar
- David Narcizo – drums

Technical personnel

- Dennis Herring – production
- John Beverly Jones – engineering
- Csaba Petocz – re-mixing on "Not Too Soon"
- Paul Q. Kolderie – re-mixing on "Red Shoes"
- Throwing Muses – re-mixing on "Red Shoes"
- Doug Sax – mastering
- David Narcizo – design
- Jim Anderson – front photography
- Andy Catlin – band photography

== Charts ==
| Chart | Peak position |
|---|---|
| UK Albums (OCC) | 26 |
