= Count Zero (band) =

American band

- Origin: Boston, Massachusetts, USA
- Genres: Prog rock
- Years active: 1993–present
- Label: SineAppleSap
- Members: Peter Moore; Will Ragano; Michael Corbett; Jude Heichelbech; Shawn Marquis
- Past members: Izzy Maxwell; Joel Simches; Eric Paull; Jeff Biegert; Alex Smoller; Bernard Georges; Brendon Downey; Elizabeth Steen
- Website: www.count-zero.com

Count Zero is a band formed in Boston, Massachusetts, in 1993 by former members of the electronic band Think Tree. The band is led by guitarist and vocalist Peter Moore. Their music has been featured on both Guitar Hero and Rock Band games.

== History ==
The band was formed by Peter Moore along with Will Ragano and Jeff Biegert in 1993. Bigert later left while Bernard Georges, Brendon Downey, Elizabeth Steen and Eric Paull were added.

2005's Little Minds contained half a dozen older songs which were "reupholstered" for the album.

== Discography ==
=== Studio albums ===
- 1997: Affluenza (SineAppleSap)
- 2001: Robots Anonymous (SineAppleSap)
- 2005: Little Minds (SineAppleSap)
- 2011: Never Be Yourself (SineAppleSap)
- 2024: Thought So (SineAppleSap)

=== Singles ===
- 2008: "Shake"

=== Appearances ===
- 2006: 2. Contamination: A Tribute to David Bowie (compilation by Various Artists) (Failure to Communicate FTC005-2)
