= Stand Up and Cheer =

Stand Up and Cheer may refer to:

- Stand Up and Cheer!, a 1934 film featuring Shirley Temple
- "Stand Up and Cheer" (song), a school fight song
- Stand Up and Cheer (TV program), a 1970s American syndicated television variety show
