= Time to Take Sides =

Studio album by The Dead 60s
- Released: 13 August 2007 France
- Recorded: Avatar (New York, New York); SeeSquaredStudios (New York, New York)
- Genre: Rock, Ska, Dub
- Label: Deltasonic, Sony/BMG
- Producer: David Kahne

The Dead 60s chronology
The Dead 60s (2005)	Time to Take Sides (2007)

Singles from Time to Take Sides
- 1. "Stand Up" Released: August 13, 2007

Time to Take Sides is the second and final studio album by Liverpool band The Dead 60s. It was first released in France on 13 August 2007. The album remains unreleased in the UK.

During the recording, the band were introduced to fellow Liverpudlian, Paul McCartney, via mutual producer David Kahne.

== Track listings ==
All tracks written by The Dead 60s.

French version

1. "Bolt of Steel" - 3:31
2. "Beat Generation" - 3:37
3. "Stand Up" - 4:07
4. "Start a War" - 3:36
5. "Dull Towns" - 4:48
6. "Last Train Home" - 4:52
7. "All Over By Midnight" - 3:02
8. "Liar" - 2:07
9. "Don't Walk Away" - 3:24
10. "Desert Sun" - 4:02
11. "Seven Empty Days" - 3:41

== Singles ==
Song	Date	Chart	Peak position
"Stand Up"	13 August 2007	United Kingdom	54
