= The Dead 60s =

English ska punk band (2003–2008)

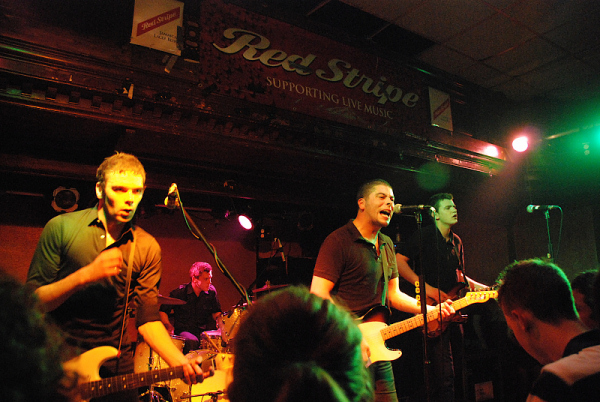
- The Dead 60s performing in 2007

Background information
- Origin: Liverpool, England
- Genres: Dub, punk rock, ska punk
- Years active: 2003–2008
- Labels: Deltasonic, Columbia, Epic, Sony BMG
- Past members: Matt McManamon (vocals, guitar); Ben Gordon (guitar, organ); Charlie Turner (bass guitar, vocals); Bryan Johnson (drums)

The Dead 60s were an English ska punk band from Liverpool. The band's sound is a mixture of punk rock, ska, dub and reggae. They have taken influences from artists such as King Tubby, Jackie Mittoo, Gang of Four and A Certain Ratio.

== History ==
Matt McManamon and Charlie Turner met at the Merchant Taylor's School for Boys in Crosby Liverpool and as teenagers formed a band, Rest Home. After changing their name to Pinhole, they released a four-track EP, ''122 Duke Street'', named after the address of Liverpool bar The Pit, where the band played many of its first shows. Ben Gordon and Bryan Johnson subsequently joined Pinhole in 2000.

Pinhole released a second EP, "Breaking Hearts & Windows", on Thrill City Records in 2001 and a single, "So Over You" / "Morning Rain", on Too Nice Records in 2002. They a recorded a John Peel session at Maida Vale studios on 27 January 2002, which was broadcast on 7 February. The tracks recorded were "Is This The End", "I'm So Bored of the USA", "City Living" and "Addicted To You". The band's single "So Over You" reached No.8 in the John Peel Festive Fifty of 2002. Pinhole toured extensively throughout the UK, supporting artists including Green Day and The Hives. However, in 2003 the band announced on their website that they had split up.

A few months later, the band reemerged under the name 'The Dead 60s'. They signed to Deltasonic Records, then home of The Coral, The Zutons and The Basement. They began to tour heavily throughout the UK, supporting artists such as Morrissey, Kasabian, The Thrills, The Music, The Coral, The Zutons, The Bees and Supergrass.

The Dead 60s released their debut album in the US on 31 May 2005 and in the UK on 26 September 2005. It was recorded at the Ranch Studios and Parr St Studios. The album was produced by Central Nervous System and remixed by Mike Hedges. The band toured throughout Europe, Japan and the US in support of the record. In the US, they toured as part of the Vans Warped Tour as well as in support of artists such as Garbage, The Bravery and Social Distortion. They also played on the bill of both the Lollapalooza Festival and the KROQ Weenie Roast. The band experienced success in the US, where their song "Riot Radio" became the third most added song at Alternative Radio behind White Stripes and Coldplay.

The band were scheduled to open The Other Stage at Glastonbury on 24 June 2005, but before their set could begin the stage was hit by lightning and their performance was cancelled. The band continued to tour throughout 2005 and 2006, playing various festivals in the US, UK, Europe and Japan.

The Dead 60s relocated to New York in 2007 to record their second album, Time To Take Sides. The album was recorded at Avatar Studios and SeeSquaredStudios. It was produced by David Kahne and engineered by Joe Barresi. On 1 September 2007, The Dead 60s performed in front of around 30,000 people at Ward Park, Bangor, Northern Ireland, at a gig headlined by Snow Patrol. Other acts included Kowalski, Simple Kid, Ash and We Are Scientists. In October 2007, Trojan Records released a compilation album entitled Riot Radio Broadcast, put together by the Dead 60s and containing fifteen of their favourite tracks from the Trojan Records vaults. Artists featured included: Horace Andy, The Upsetters, Tapper Zukie, The Reggaeites and Lloyd Robinson.

On 15 November 2007, Terry Hall joined the band for their encore at a Fred Perry subculture gig at the 100 Club, London. The songs they performed were covers of The Equals' "Police on My Back" and "Friday Night, Saturday Morning" by The Specials. Hall sang lead vocals on both tracks.

In November 2007, a Dead 60s limited edition Fred Perry Harrington Jacket was launched. Designed with input from the band, the jacket was a reversed Harrington jacket available in two designs: Cornish Tartan and Stuart Tartan. Only 500 of each design were made. Each jacket was individually numbered and came with a Dead 60s neck label.

The band issued a press release on 8 February 2008 announcing their split.

== In popular culture ==
The song "Riot Radio" is featured in the film, Nick and Norah's Infinite Playlist, starring Michael Cera and Kat Dennings. The song is also featured on the soundtrack, compiled by Mark Mothersbaugh of Devo, and was released on 23 September 2008. It was also used in the video games Burnout Legends and Burnout Revenge.

The song "A Different Age" was used in the 2006 video game Driver: Parallel Lines.

== Later projects ==
Charlie Turner and Bryan Johnson toured and recorded with Sir Paul McCartney's son, James McCartney. Ben Gordon, Charlie Turner and Bryan Johnson backed Terry Hall at a rare solo show at the 100 Club, London in June 2008.

Bryan Johnson toured and recorded with Cold Specks, Basia Bulat, Tom Speight and Tom Visser, recorded TV & Film soundtracks for Ashes, Spike Island and The Athena with Tim Wheeler and Ilan Ishkeri, and performed in Creation Stories. He is also a music industry executive working at Spotify. Matt McManamon toured with The Specials as lead guitarist and released his solo album Scally Folk on 28 May 2021.

== Discography ==
=== Pinhole ===
Year	EP	Producer	Record label
2001	"Breaking Hearts & Windows”	John Robb	Thrill City
2002	"So Over You" / "Morning Rain"	Mark Freegard	Too Nice Recordings

=== Studio albums ===
Title	Album details	Peak chart positions				Certifications
Title	Album details	UK	FRA	IRE	SCO	Certifications
The Dead 60s	Released: 31 May 2005; Label: Deltasonic (#DLT038); Formats: CD, LP	23	97	65	23	UK: Silver
Time to Take Sides	Released: 13 August 2007; Label: Deltasonic (#DLT066); Formats: CD	—	135	—	—	
"—" denotes items that did not chart or were not released in that territory.

=== Singles ===
Year	Title	Peak chart positions		Album
Year	Title	UK	SCO	Album
2004	"You're Not the Law"	—	—	The Dead 60s
2004	"Riot Radio"	30	33	The Dead 60s
2005	"The Last Resort"	24	27	The Dead 60s
2005	"Loaded Gun"	28	—	The Dead 60s
2005	"Riot Radio" (re-release)	30	29	The Dead 60s
2005	"Ghostfaced Killer"	25	28	The Dead 60s
2007	"Stand Up"	54	22	Time to Take Sides
"—" denotes items that did not chart or were not released in that territory.
