= Throwing Muses (2003 album) =

Studio album by Throwing Muses
- Released: March 17, 2003
- Recorded: August–December 2002
- Genre: Alternative rock
- Length: 51:24
- Label: 4AD
- Producer: Throwing Muses

Throwing Muses chronology
Limbo (1996)	Throwing Muses (2003)	Purgatory/Paradise (2013)

Professional ratings
Review scores
Source	Rating
AllMusic	link
NME	8/10 link
Pitchfork Media	8.2/10 link
Rolling Stone	link

Throwing Muses is the eighth studio album by the alternative rock band Throwing Muses. It was recorded over three weekends and released simultaneously with Kristin Hersh's solo record The Grotto on March 17, 2003. The album features Bernard Georges on bass and David Narcizo on drums as well as original bandmate Tanya Donelly on backing vocals.

== Track listing ==
All songs written by Kristin Hersh.

1. "Mercury" – 4:14
2. "Pretty or Not" – 3:30
3. "Civil Disobedience" – 3:13
4. "Pandora's Box" – 5:20
5. "Status Quo" – 4:19
6. "Speed and Sleep" – 5:10
7. "Portia" – 3:38
8. "SolarDip" – 3:33
9. "Epiphany" – 3:16
10. "Los Flamingos" – 3:08
11. "Half Blast" – 6:14
12. "Flying" – 5:50

== Personnel ==
- Kristin Hersh – vocals and guitars
- Bernard Georges – bass
- David Narcizo – drums and percussion
- Tanya Donelly – backing vocals on 1, 4, 9, 11 & 12

Production

- Producer: Throwing Muses
- Engineer: Steve Rizzo
- Mixed: Ethan Allen
- Design: Vaughan Oliver and Chris Bigg
- Artwork: Shinro Ohtake
