= Tanya Donelly =

American musician (born 1966)

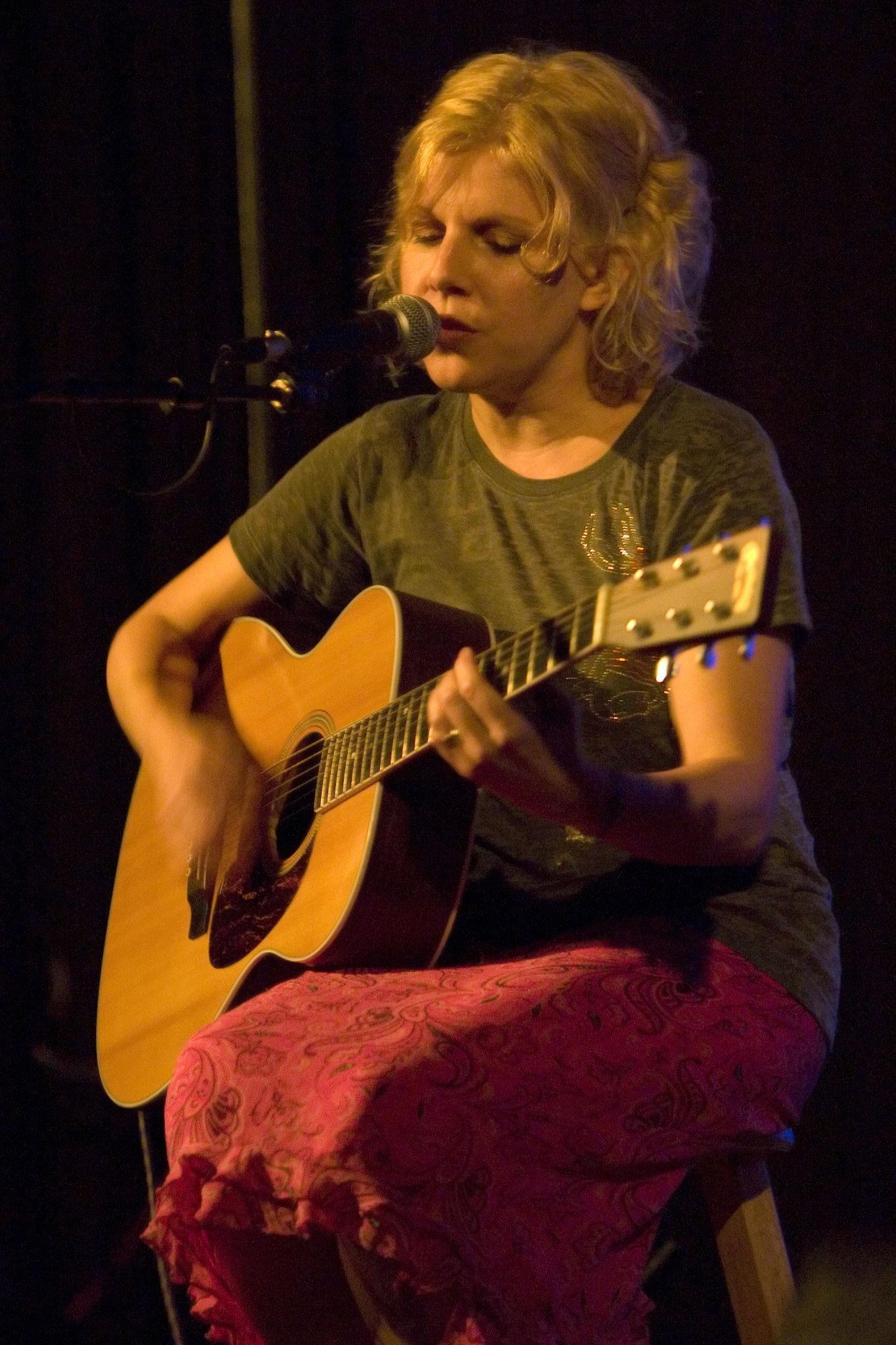
- Donelly performing in 2007

Background information
- Born: July 14, 1966 (age 60)
- Origin: Newport, Rhode Island, U.S.
- Genres: Indie rock; alternative rock
- Occupations: Singer; songwriter; guitarist
- Years active: 1981–present

Tanya Donelly (born July 14, 1966) is an American singer-songwriter and guitarist based in New England. She came to prominence as a co-founder of the band Throwing Muses with her step-sister Kristin Hersh. Donelly went on to co-form the alternative rock band The Breeders alongside Kim Deal in 1989, before leaving to front her own band Belly in 1991. By the late 1990s, she settled into a solo recording career, working largely with musicians connected to the Boston music scene.

Donelly was nominated for a Grammy in the mid-1990s as lead vocalist and songwriter for Belly, when she scored a national radio and music television hit with her composition "Feed the Tree". Belly recorded on Sire/Reprise Records and 4AD Records; Donelly's solo works have been released on Warner Bros. Records and 4AD.

Over the years, she has listed several musical influences. In one interview, she named her guitar playing influences as Marc Ribot, the Beatles, and former bandmate Hersh. More recently, she mentioned Leonard Cohen as a songwriting hero, citing her then-current listening favorites as Lucinda Williams and Joan Wasser, and listing Boston-based groups like the Dambuilders, Pixies, and Count Zero as past favorites. Although Donelly mainly performs her own original songs, she has in recent years added covers of songs by Robyn Hitchcock, Nina Simone, the Beatles, and Pixies to her repertoire.

== Early life ==
Donelly has said that her parents, Richard and Kristin Donelly, shuttled the family "between Rhode Island and California" for the first four years of her life. Donelly has described her early school experience as including bouts of nervous shyness from fear that what she has called her family's "hippie" background was different from that of her classmates.

Donelly has said that she met Kristin Hersh in school around age eight, quickly becoming close friends. Donelly's father later married Hersh's mother after both divorced in the 1980s. When she was 12 years old, Donelly and her mother were injured in a traumatic car accident that led her to carefully weigh for the first time her spiritual values and her concept of what "God" was. Previously, her upbringing had been an atheist one, but after the car accident a family friend introduced Donelly to the Hindu traditions of Krishna, in which she immersed herself for a brief period. She graduated from Rogers High School in Newport, Rhode Island.

== Throwing Muses band beginnings ==
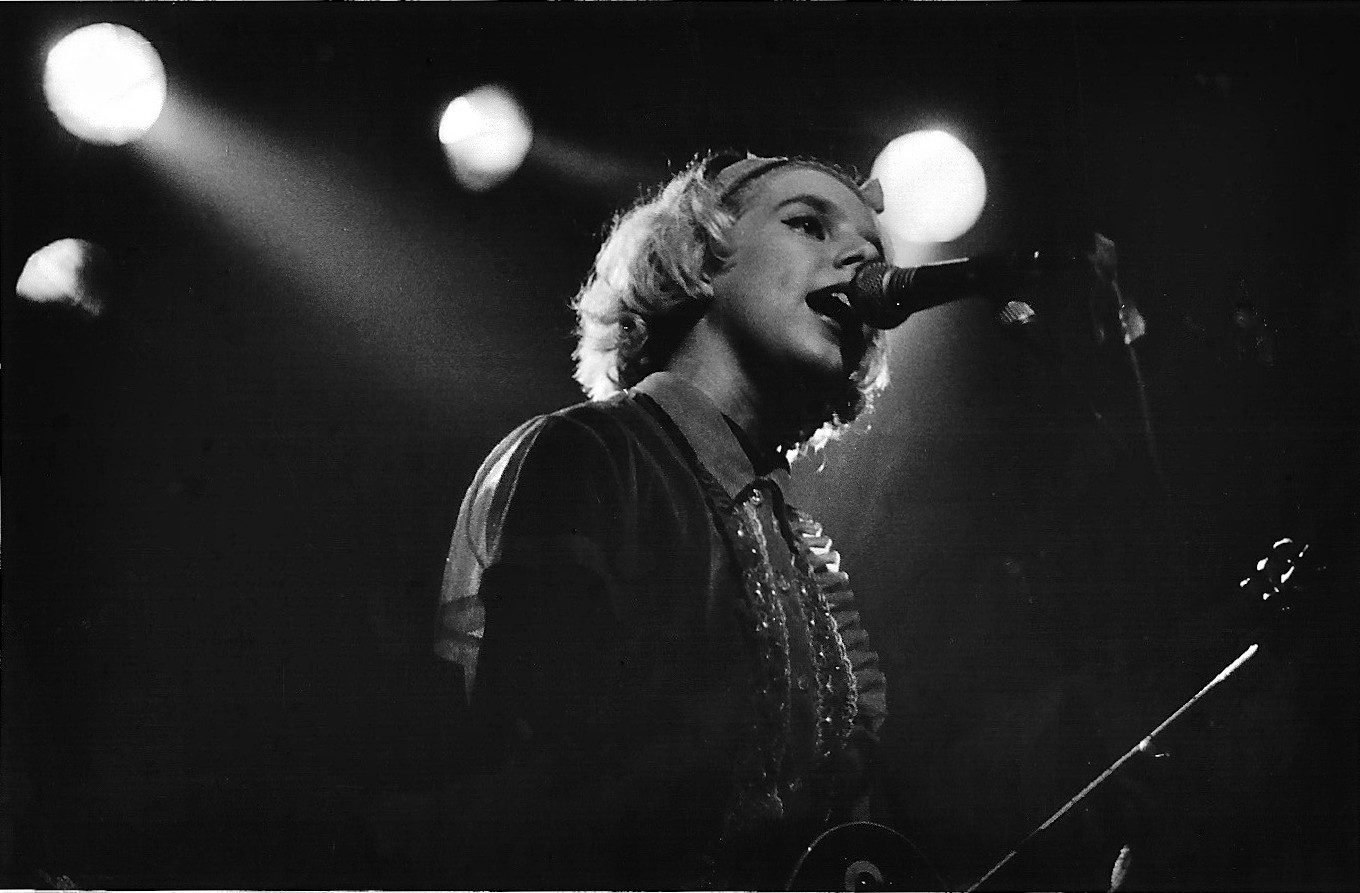
Donelly performing with Throwing Muses, 1991

Tanya Donelly along with Kristin Hersh began playing guitar around the age of 14 and started writing original songs shortly thereafter. She co-founded the alternative rock band Throwing Muses in the early 1980s alongside Kristin Hersh and other members, including Elaine Adamedes. Donelly served as the band’s lead guitarist and contributed as a secondary vocalist and songwriter.

Throwing Muses relocated from Rhode Island to Boston around 1986 and became the first American band signed to the British independent record label 4AD. Donelly's songwriting style during her tenure in the band has been characterized as distinct from Hersh’s, with a focus on more conventional structures and melodies. Her compositions included tracks such as "Green," "Reel," "Pools in Eyes," "Not Too Soon," "Giant", "Dragonhead", and "Honeychain."

She also contributed lead guitar work, backing vocals, and harmonies on several tracks across the band’s discography, including those featured on the album The Real Ramona. Donelly departed the band in the early 1990s to pursue other musical projects.

== 1990s: Breeders and Belly ==
By 1990, Donelly had additionally begun working in a side project called The Breeders with Kim Deal of Pixies, a Boston-based group who had opened shows for Throwing Muses in the 1980s. The first album's vocals and songwriting responsibilities were centered on Deal. The group released Pod with Donelly in 1990.

The Real Ramona, Throwing Muses' last album with Donelly, which included her "Not Too Soon" and "Honeychain" originals, was released in 1991. In May 1991, Deal and Donelly were asked to contribute vocals to This Mortal Coil's Blood album on 4AD, with a cover of Chris Bell's "You and Your Sister," a month before Donelly officially left Throwing Muses.

In December 1991, Donelly formed Belly as guitarist, vocalist and songwriter, with Thomas Gorman on lead guitar, Chris Gorman on drums, and Fred Abong (previously with Throwing Muses) on bass guitar. This group would become her primary creative focus for the next few years, as Donelly's participation in The Breeders faded after the 1992 release of the Safari EP.

In 1993 Belly released the Star LP, with Gail Greenwood replacing Fred Abong on bass after the release for touring. The album soon peaked at number two on the United Kingdom music charts and featured a single and music video, "Feed the Tree", that quickly was rated number one on the Modern Rock Tracks Survey. The album scored commercial chart successes and was certified as a gold record in 1994 by the RIAA. The band was also nominated for two Grammy Awards (Best New Artist and Best Alternative Music Performance) and won two Boston Music Awards the same year.

In 1995, Belly released a second album, King, which progressed the avant folk-rock influences, power-pop jangle guitar sounds, and vocal harmonies of the first album into a direction driven more by vocals and driving rhythms, varying the pace within the songs to create tension. Flangers and chorus effects were evident in the guitar sounds. This album, produced by Glyn Johns, did not match the commercial success of Star. The band broke up in 1996.

== 1990s solo career begins ==
In 1995, during her post-Belly/pre-solo career, Donelly recorded a track with Catherine Wheel entitled "Judy Staring at the Sun," which appeared on Catherine Wheel's 1995 album Happy Days. The single version featured Donelly and Catherine Wheel's lead singer Rob Dickinson singing in trade-off vocals, but after the final Belly album, Catherine Wheel's record label insisted that the song be re-recorded to remove most of Donelly's vocals, replacing them with Dickinson's, although Donelly's voice can still be heard during the chorus of the reworked version.

The 1995 tribute album Saturday Morning: Cartoons' Greatest Hits, produced by Ralph Sall for MCA Records, included the cover of "Josie and the Pussycats" performed by Tanya Donelly and Juliana Hatfield.

In November 1996, Donelly put together a group of musicians to tour internationally with, just prior to her first solo release, the Sliding & Diving EP on 4AD. Included on the tour were husband Fisher on bass, keyboardist Lisa Mednick (formerly of Juliana Hatfield's group), drummer Stacy Jones (formerly of Letters to Cleo and Veruca Salt), and Madder Rose guitarists Mary Lorson and Billy Coté. The album release featured Donelly on vocals, guitars and keyboards, Rich Gilbert (of Human Sexual Response, Goober & the Peas, Blackstone Valley Sinners) on pedal steel, Fisher on bass, and drummers David Lovering (formerly of the Pixies) and Jones.

After the 1997 dual solo release of Pretty Deep with two different B-sides, she toured North America with Fisher, Throwing Muses' drummer Dave Narcizo, Gilbert, and keyboardist Elizabeth Steen. She soon released her solo debut LP Lovesongs for Underdogs, recorded with Gilbert, Fisher, Jones, Narcizo, and engineer Wally Gagel on assorted instruments.

== Career since 2000 ==
In 2000, Donelly performed live in her first reunion with Throwing Muses at a special fan gathering called "Gut Pageant" in Cambridge, Massachusetts, and at a Rhode Island festival.

She continued to record and release symbol-laden, alternative folk-pop solo EPs and full-length LPs on 4AD in 2001, 2002, and 2004. Belly's Sweet Ride: The Best of Belly retrospective was also released in 2002.

As Donelly's writing continued to mature into a softer rhythmic vein than with the Belly material, allusions to motherhood were heard in songs like "Life is But a Dream" and "The Night You Saved My Life" on her 2002 Beautysleep release. Mark Sandman, of Boston's Morphine indie-rock group, sang on "Moonbeam Monkey." Donelly's background vocals are heard on several tracks of the 2003 self-titled Throwing Muses reunion album, which she helped promote with public performances as backing vocalist and guitarist for a few concerts in 2003. Boston post-punk band Mission of Burma included Donelly's backing vocals on their reunion album, Onoffon in 2004.

The same year, she released Whiskey Tango Ghosts, a sparely arranged, acoustic album laced with Gilbert's pedal steel guitar touches. The album's personnel included Steen on piano, Narcizo on drums, and Fisher on guitar, bass, and drums. The album's lyrics explored, in part, marital relationships and family life. Donelly has said the album's minor-key tone was influenced by "a horrible war, a horrible administration, a bleak, mean winter."

She then followed that acoustic album release with three weekend shows of old and new songs performed in 2004 before audiences at The Windham, an old hotel in Bellows Falls, Vermont. Backing Donelly in concert were Fisher on guitar, Gilbert on pedal steel and acoustic guitar, Joan Wasser (of the Dambuilders, and Joan as Policewoman, Lou Reed, Antony and the Johnsons) on violin and backing vocals, Joe McMahon (of Señor Happy and Will Dailey) on upright bass, Bill Janovitz (lead singer of Buffalo Tom) contributing vocals, and Arthur Johnson (of Come) on drums. The performances were recorded by Donelly's manager, veteran producer Gary Smith of Fort Apache Studios, which helps operate the small concert space and recording room in The Windham's lobby. While Donelly included some of her longtime lyrical allusions to nature imagery, such as bees and honey, in the songs recorded at the Vermont concerts, she said that some of her new material reflected a more direct approach, relying less on symbolic analogy. The topics of religion and spiritual hypocrisy, which first began to interest her after her childhood automobile accident, were reflected in the lyrics to "Kundalini Slide," performed at these concerts. The album of the Vermont performances is titled This Hungry Life and was released by Eleven Thirty Records on October 17, 2006 in the US and October 24, 2006 in Canada.

In June 2005, Donelly mentioned on her official "Slumberland" message board that her future plans included working on a children's compilation album with Boston musicians such as Chris Toppin, writing a book, working with Mark Eitzel and Greek songwriter Manolis Famellos, and occasionally performing live. She planned to focus future performance plans on a few cities like Boston, New York, and London, playing live when time permitted as she raised her daughter. In March 2006, she gave birth to another daughter, Harriet Pearl Fisher.

In early 2006, Donelly sang on two songs on the debut EP from the Boston-based band Dylan In The Movies. In October 2006, she recorded a cover of Neil Young's "Heart of Gold" with producer Paul Kolderie for the American Laundromat Records benefit CD titled Cinnamon Girl - Women Artists Cover Neil Young for Charity.

She wrote four songs for the pop girl group Girl Authority for their second debut Road Trip, one of which is titled "This Is My Day". Her daughter, Gracie, is a fan of the group, according to an article in The Phoenix.

Two shows at the Brattle Theatre in Cambridge, Massachusetts, on October 6, 2007, were a musical reunion of sorts, as Donelly co-headlined with Hersh.

In 2008, Donelly teamed up with Dylan in the Movies to cover the Cure's "Lovecats" for American Laundromat Records tribute compilation Just Like Heaven - a tribute to The Cure. They later repeated this pairing to cover the Smiths' "Shoplifters of the World Unite" in 2011.

A 2010 feature in Spin Magazine profiled Donelly's new career as a postpartum doula.

In December 2010, Donelly teamed up once again with singer and songwriter Brian Sullivan's band, Dylan In The Movies, to release the single "Girl With the Black Tights" on American Laundromat Records. Donelly shares a co-writing credit and sings on the track, which was later included on his album release in 2014.

In August 2013, Donelly surprised her audience by announcing a series of extended plays to be issued online. Each release featured songs co-written with friends, musicians and previous collaborators including authors. The first volume contained five songs; "Mass Ave" (for which a video was also released), "Christopher Street", "Let Fall The Sky", "Blame The Muse", and "Meteor Shower". In a rare and extensive interview on a podcast by UK music website The Mouth Magazine, Donelly announced that the series was her way of taking control of an exit strategy as she retired from the music industry. The recordings from the 5 EPs were released as a 31 track compilation, the Swan Song Series.

In early February 2016, the official Belly website announced the group would reform to play shows in Europe the following July and, subsequently, North America. The group released a new album, Dove, in 2018. They took a hiatus after 2018, but have toured again since 2023.

An album of covers with the Parkington Sisters was released in 2020, including of tracks by Leonard Cohen and her oft stated influence, Mary Margaret O'Hara.

Donelly was slated to compose the score for the 2022 animated film Luck, but was replaced by John Debney.

In 2020, Donelly formed a new duo with long time collaborator Brian Sullivan, entitled The Loyal Seas. The debut single "Strange Mornings in the Garden" was released in December 2020. The duo's debut album Strange Mornings In the Garden followed in 2022.

In 2026, Donelly and Chris Brokaw released "The Undone Is Done Again" on Fire Records, containing tracks that are adaptations of Medieval music, with lyrics in the original Latin and minimal instrumentation.

== Personal life ==
On September 22, 1996 Donnelly married bassist Dean Fisher, known for his work with Juliana Hatfield. They have two daughters.

== Discography ==
=== Throwing Muses ===
Albums

- Throwing Muses (1986)
- House Tornado (1988)
- Hunkpapa (1989)
- The Real Ramona (1991)
- Throwing Muses (2003) (backing vocals on tracks 1, 4, 9, 11 & 12)

EPs

- Stand Up (1984)
- Chains Changed (1987)
- The Fat Skier (1987)
- Counting Backwards (1991)

=== The Breeders ===
Albums

- Pod (1990)

EPs

- Safari (1992)

=== Belly ===
Albums

- Star (1993)
- King (1995)
- Dove (2018)

EPs

- Slow Dust (1992)
- Gepetto (1992)
- Feed the Tree (1993)
- Moon (1993)
- Seal My Fate (1995)
- Now They'll Sleep (1995)
- Super-Connected (1995)
- Sun (1995)
- Feel (2018)

=== Solo ===
Albums

- Lovesongs for Underdogs (1997)
- Beautysleep (2002)
- Whiskey Tango Ghosts (2004)
- This Hungry Life (2006)

EPs

- Sliding & Diving (1996)
- The Bright Light, disc 1 (1997)
- The Bright Light, disc 2 (1997)
- Pretty Deep, disc 1 (1997)
- Pretty Deep, disc 2 (1997)
- Sleepwalk (2001)
- Swan Song Series, Vol. 1 (2013)
- Swan Song Series, Vol. 2 (2013)
- Swan Song Series, Vol. 3 (2013)
- Swan Song Series, Vol. 4 (2014)
- Swan Song Series, Vol. 5 (2014)
- The Undone is Done Again (2026)

Other albums

- Beautysleep and Lovesongs Demos (2006)

=== Tanya Donelly and the Parkington Sisters ===
- Tanya Donelly and the Parkington Sisters with the Parkington Sisters (2020)

=== Other releases ===
- This Mortal Coil - Blood (1991) (co-vocals with Kim Deal on "You and Your Sister")

== Other sources ==
- Fortier, James. Tanya Donelly: Storyboard to the singer/songwriter's career.
- Koradi, Reto (February 27, 1995). "Review: Belly, King". Consumable. Archived from the original on September 21, 2013.
- Krinsky, David (February 20, 2002). "Tanya Donelly Gets Her Beauty Sleep: College rocker grows up on second solo effort". Rolling Stone.
- "Lovesongs for Underdogs Credits". Allmusic.
- Milano, Brett (November 21, 1996). "On Her Own: Tanya Donelly Begins Life After Belly". Boston Phoenix.
- Obrecht, Jas (March 1995). "Belly Up! The Rise of Tanya Donelly & Tom Gorman". Guitar Player.
- Phares, Heather (2002). "Beautysleep Review". Allmusic.
- White, Timothy (January 16, 1993). "Discovering Belly's Personal Politics". Billboard.
- "Tanya Donelly's This Hungry Life Set for October 17th Release". Eleven Thirty Records. Archived from the original on August 10, 2006.
- "Tanya Donelly - The Mouthcast". The Mouth Magazine.
