= Throwing Muses (1986 album) =

Studio album by Throwing Muses
- Released: 20 September 1986
- Recorded: December 1985–June 1986
- Genre: Post-punk, alternative rock
- Length: 37:36
- Language: English
- Label: 4AD
- Producer: Gil Norton

Throwing Muses chronology
The Doghouse Cassette (1985)	Throwing Muses (1986)	Chains Changed EP (1987)

Singles from Throwing Muses
- 1. "Soul Soldier" Released: September 1986 (promo)

Throwing Muses is the 1986 debut album of the band Throwing Muses, released on British independent label 4AD. This was the first album by an American band to be released on 4AD, which had concentrated primarily on British-based acts up to this point. The release marked a shift in the label's direction; a year later 4AD would sign Pixies based in part on the band's connection to Throwing Muses, and by the mid-1990s much of the label's roster was made up of American bands.

== Production ==
All the songs on the album were written by Kristin Hersh, with the exception of "Green", written by Tanya Donelly. The album was produced by Gil Norton, who went on to produce albums for Pixies. The band considers the album to be untitled, with Throwing Muses the name they give to another album released in 2003.

== Release history ==
The album was originally released in the UK by 4AD in August 1986 (CAD607) on LP, CD and cassette. Sometime around the early 1990s, the album went out of print, as plans were made by the band's American label, Sire Records to issue the album for the first time in the US, along with 1987's Chains Changed EP, which had also never seen American release. After Throwing Muses were dropped by Sire following the disappointing sales for 1995's critical favorite University, plans for the re-issue were dropped.

The band later resurrected the re-issue project, issuing the 2-CD compilation In a Doghouse in 1998 on 4AD (DAD607CD) in the UK, and on Rykodisc in the USA. This compilation not only contained the debut LP and EP as originally planned, but also (on the second CD) the demo tape that convinced 4AD president Ivo Watts-Russell to sign the band; newly recorded versions of songs originally written in the band's early years; and the band's award-winning 1987 video for the song "Fish".

== Reception ==
Professional ratings
Review scores
Source	Rating
AllMusic	5/5 stars
Pitchfork	9.2/10
The Rolling Stone Album Guide	4/5 stars
Sounds	5/5 stars
Spin Alternative Record Guide	10/10
The Village Voice	C

AllMusic calls the album a "powerful debut" whose "startling collision of punk energy, folky melodicism, and Kristin Hersh's mercurial voice and lyrics...puts the work of most self-consciously 'tortured' artists to shame." The review praises the record's "fluid, effortless emotional shifts"—also described as "violent, vibrant mood swings". The album was also included in the book 1001 Albums You Must Hear Before You Die.

Spin called it, "a record of dense textures, guitar splatter and belljar lyrics. The fragmented sound of Throwing Muses, a college girl's dining hall conversation set to antagonistic electric screeching, was painful, self-loathing, man-love-hating, ".

== Track listing ==
All songs written by Kristin Hersh except "Green", written by Tanya Donelly.

1. "Call Me" – 3:59
2. "Green" – 3:04
3. "Hate My Way" – 4:06
4. "Vicky's Box" – 5:09
5. "Rabbits Dying" – 3:49
6. "America (She Can't Say No)" – 2:47
7. "Fear" – 2:45
8. "Stand Up" – 2:56
9. "Soul Soldier" – 5:10
10. "Delicate Cutters" – 3:53

== Personnel ==
- Kristin Hersh – guitars, vocals, synthesizer
- Tanya Donelly – guitars, vocals, percussion
- Leslie Langston – bass
- David Narcizo – drums, percussion
- Dave Knowles – keyboards
- Ronald Stone – additional guitar

Technical

- Gil Norton – production
- Richard Donelly – photography
