= Throwing Muses =

American alternative rock band

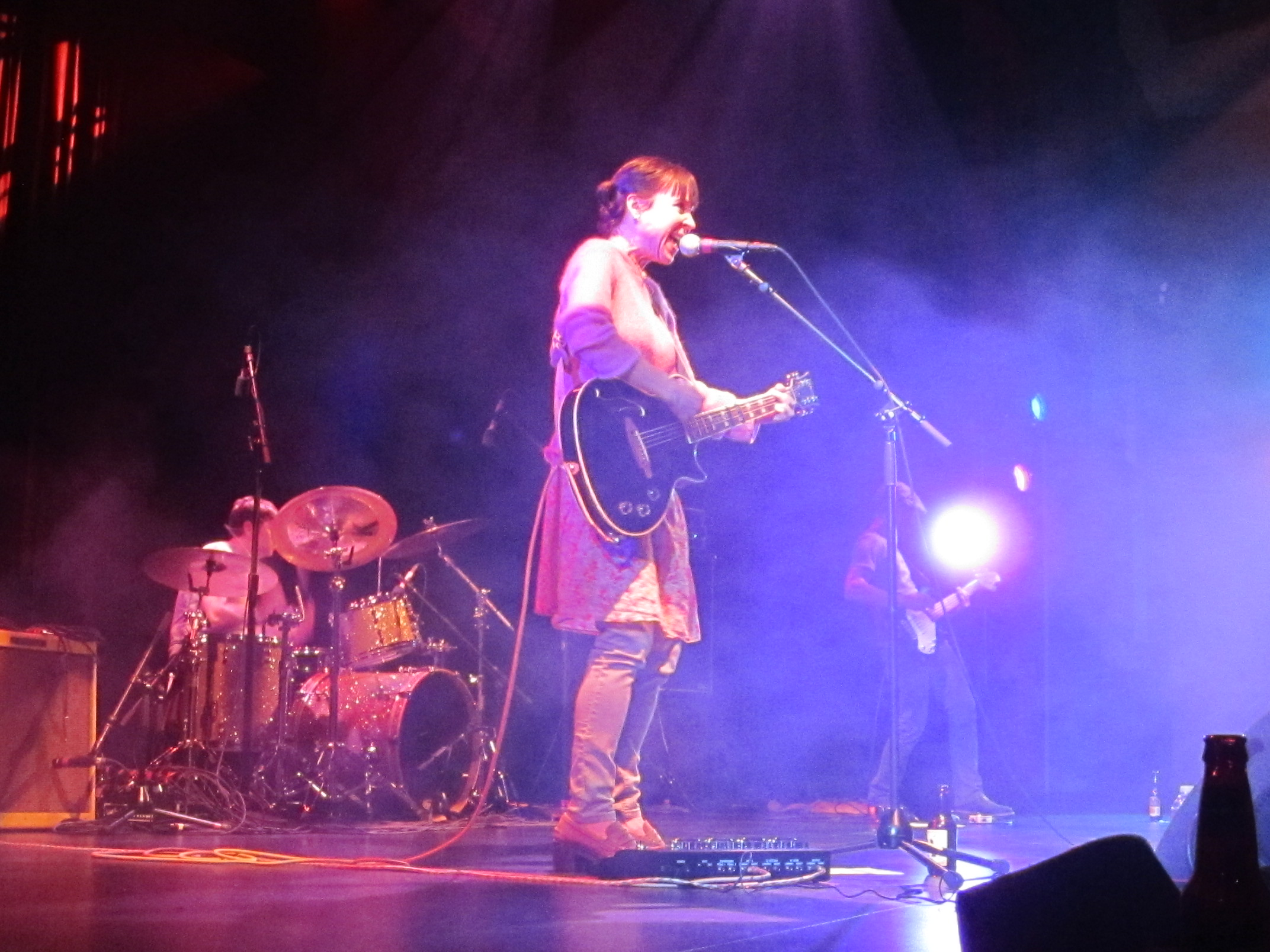
- Throwing Muses: David Narcizo, Kristin Hersh, Bernard Georges – San Francisco, 2014

Background information
- Origin: Newport, Rhode Island, U.S.
- Genres: Alternative rock, post-punk
- Works: Discography
- Years active: 1981–1997, 2002–present
- Labels: 4AD, Sire, Warner Bros.
- Spinoffs: 50 Foot Wave; Belly; The Breeders; Lakuna
- Members: Kristin Hersh; David Narcizo; Bernard Georges
- Past members: Tanya Donelly; Leslie Langston; Fred Abong; Elaine Adamedes; Becca Blumen
- Website: throwingmuses.com

Throwing Muses are an American alternative rock band formed in 1981 in Newport, Rhode Island that toured and recorded extensively until 1997, when its members began concentrating more on other projects.

The group was originally fronted by two step-sisters, Kristin Hersh and Tanya Donelly, who both wrote the group's songs. Throwing Muses are known for performing music with shifting tempos, creative chord progressions, unorthodox song structures, and surreal lyrics. The group was set apart from other contemporary acts by Hersh's stark, candid writing style; Donelly's pop stylings and vocal harmonies; and David Narcizo's unusual drumming techniques eschewing use of cymbals.

== History ==
=== 1983–1986: Formation, first EP and The Doghouse Cassette, debut album ===
Throwing Muses were formed in 1983 by Kristin Hersh and her half-sister Tanya Donelly, who were both attending Rogers High School. They initially called themselves "Kristin Hersh and the Muses", in which they were accompanied by bass player Elaine Adamedes and drummer Becca Blumen, who later were replaced by Leslie Langston and David Narcizo, respectively. Narcizo did not originally know how to play the drums, but when Hersh told him Blumen had left the band and he could join, Narcizo said, "I had never played a drum kit before – all I'd played was marching drums and concert drums. We found somebody whose kit we could borrow, but it arrived without cymbals. I learned to play on it without cymbals which then became my trademark early on."

Throwing Muses released their debut self-titled EP in 1984 on their own Blowing Fuses label. In 1985, they released a set of demos, later known as "The Doghouse Cassette," garnering extensive coverage in the local music press. Demo producer Gary Smith of Fort Apache Studios led them to sign with 4AD, where they became the label's first American band. Kristin recalls, "I signed with them because [owner] Ivo [Watts-Russell] was funny and goofy, and that was about it." In 1986, they released their self-titled debut album produced by Gil Norton. Hersh has written the memoir Rat Girl about the year the band moved to Boston, was signed, and recorded their first album.

=== 1987–1991: further EPs, House Tornado, Hunkpapa and The Real Ramona ===
In 1987, Throwing Muses released two EPs, Chains Changed and The Fat Skier, released July 6. These were followed in 1988 by their second studio album, House Tornado, produced by Gary Smith and engineered by Paul Kolderie; it was recorded at Fort Apache Studios in Cambridge, Massachusetts. The album was released internationally on the 4AD label, except in the United States, where it was released by Sire Records. Sire used a different album cover for its release, as the label was putting a strong promotional push behind the band, and label executives favored a picture of the band over the collage featured on the 4AD release. Both House Tornado and the Fat Skier were combined on a single CD in a later release. The band embarked on a tour of the UK, supported by the Pixies, to support House Tornado.

In 1989, the band released their third album, Hunkpapa, which was produced by Gary Smith and engineered by Steve Haigler. The album saw Hersh experimenting with more conventional melodic structures, although the fractious lyrics remained. The song “Dizzy” was released as a single.

In 1990, bassist Leslie Langston left and was replaced by Fred Abong. Throwing Muses recorded their fourth album, The Real Ramona during the same year. The Real Ramona is considered to have a more poppy sound than their previous records. The song "Counting Backwards" from the album was released as a single. Shortly after the album's release in 1991, Tanya Donelly left the Muses to form Belly, taking Abong with her.

=== 1992–2002: Work as trio – Red Heaven, University, Limbo and disbandment ===
With Donelly not being replaced, Throwing Muses opted to continue as a trio, with Bernard Georges replacing Abong on bass. In 1992, the band made a fresh start recording their fifth album Red Heaven at The Power Station and Fort Apache Studios. The album was produced by Throwing Muses and Steve Boyer, and also featured guest appearances by Leslie Langston and by Hüsker Dü frontman Bob Mould (the latter duetting with Hersh on the song "Dio").

In 1993, they recorded their sixth album, University. Hersh recorded her debut album, Hips and Makers, immediately after recording finished on University. Hips and Makers was released first, in 1994, which delayed the release of University until 1995. University gave the band their first national U.S. hit, "Bright Yellow Gun". The album was favorably reviewed.

Throwing Muses released their seventh album, Limbo, which was followed by a tour. However, the band disbanded in 1997 as Kristin Hersh went on to continue her solo career.

=== 2002–present: Reformation – Throwing Muses, Purgatory, etc. ===
In March 2003, Throwing Muses came back with their eighth album, Throwing Muses, which also saw the return of Tanya Donelly who provided backing vocals on the album. A greatest hits compilation titled Anthology was released in 2011. The band's ninth album, Purgatory / Paradise was released on October 29, 2013 in the UK and November 11 in the US.

In early 2014, the band toured a few U.S. cities, with Donelly opening for the East Coast dates.

The first single from their new album Sun Racket, titled "Dark Blue", was released in February 2020. The album was released on Fire Records on September 4, 2020.

The new album titled Moonlight Concessions released in March 2025 again on Fire Records was preceded by three singles. The album was well received by critics.

== Personnel ==
Long-term core lineup

- Kristin Hersh: vocals, guitar (1981–present)
- David Narcizo: drums (1983–present)
- Bernard Georges: bass (1992–present)

Other members

- Fred Abong: bass (1990–91)
- Elaine Adamedes: bass, vocals (1981–1983)
- Becca Blumen: drums, vocals (1981–1983)
- Tanya Donelly: vocals, guitar (1981–1991, guest in concerts and recording 2001, 2003 and 2014)
- Leslie Langston: bass (1984–1990, recording briefly 1992)

== Discography ==
=== Studio albums ===
- Throwing Muses (1986)
- House Tornado (1988)
- Hunkpapa (1989) (No. 59, UK Albums Chart)
- The Real Ramona (1991) (No. 26, UK Albums Chart)
- Red Heaven (1992) (No. 13, UK Albums Chart)
- University (1995) (No. 10, UK Albums Chart; No. 10, US Billboard Heatseekers Album Chart)
- Limbo (1996) (No. 36, UK Albums Chart; No. 34, US Billboard Heatseekers Album Chart)
- Throwing Muses (2003) (No. 75, UK Albums Chart; No. 26, US Billboard Top Indie Albums Chart)
- Purgatory / Paradise (2013)
- Sun Racket (2020)
- Moonlight Concessions (2025)

=== Live albums ===
- The Curse – Live Album (1992) – UK Albums Chart: No. 74
- Live in Providence (2001)

=== Chart singles ===
Year	Title	Peak chart positions			Album
Year	Title	UK	US Alt	US	Album
1989	"Dizzy"	85	8	–	Hunkpapa
1991	"Counting Backwards"	70	11	–	The Real Ramona
1991	"Not Too Soon"	–	–	–	The Real Ramona
1992	"Firepile"	46	–	–	Red Heaven
1995	"Bright Yellow Gun"	51	20	118	University
1996	"Shark"	53	–	–	Limbo
