= Bernard Georges =

American bass guitar player (born 1965)

Bernard Georges (born March 29, 1965) is best known for his bass guitar work in Throwing Muses and 50 Foot Wave.

Beginning in 1992, he played bass for Throwing Muses on their album releases and in their concert appearances, having previously worked as roadie for the group. Georges has also played bass on recordings by Lakuna as well as by the Boston-based bands Fritter and Count Zero.

Since 2003, Georges has recorded and toured primarily with the California-based 50 Foot Wave. He also works on the side as a bicycle shop technician.
