= David Narcizo =

American drummer

- Born: June 6, 1966 (age 60); Newport, Rhode Island
- Instruments: Drums

David John Narcizo (born May 6, 1966, in Newport, Rhode Island) is an American musician and graphic designer, primarily known for his work as the longtime drummer for Throwing Muses.

== Career ==
Narcizo played drums on Tanya Donelly's Lovesongs for Underdogs, Sleepwalk, Beautysleep, and Whiskey Tango Ghosts solo recordings, also performing some of the drum programming on Kristin Hersh's Sky Motel solo album.

After the first dissolution of Throwing Muses following the group's 1996 Limbo album, Narcizo started an electronic instrumental project called Lakuna, including the participation of wife Melissa "Misi" Narcizo, Bernard Georges, Belly's Tom Gorman, Kristin Hersh, and Frank Gardner. Lakuna's Castle of Crime CD was released in 1999 on the 4AD Records label and on Throwing Muses' own boutique label, called Throwing Music.

In the early 2000s, Narcizo performed with Throwing Muses again at a couple of fan events called "Gut Pageants." His trademark steady beat and agility with complex rhythms were highlighted in a self-titled Throwing Muses reunion album release in 2003, which the group supported with concert appearances in Europe and major U.S. cities that year.

Narcizo began increasingly focusing his time on his Newport graphic design firm, called "Lakuna, Inc.," co-owned with his wife, also a graphic artist. Because his new business responsibilities made it impractical for Narcizo to continue touring full-time with Throwing Muses after the 2003 concerts were completed, he helped Hersh find a drummer for her emerging 50 Foot Wave band concept. Narcizo had designed some of Throwing Muses' past album artwork; he continues with his Lakuna, Inc., graphics firm to help design album covers for bands like 50 Foot Wave, while providing print media design and promotional services for businesses in Newport.
