= El Dorado (disambiguation) =

El Dorado is a mythical city of gold.

El Dorado or Eldorado may also refer to:

== Places ==
=== Argentina ===
- Eldorado, Misiones
- Eldorado Department

=== Brazil ===
- Eldorado (Belo Horizonte Metro)
- Eldorado, São Paulo
- Eldorado, Mato Grosso do Sul
- Eldorado do Sul

=== Canada ===
- Eldorado, Ontario
- Eldorado, Saskatchewan
- Eldorado Creek, a creek that runs by the former gold rush town Grand Forks, Yukon

=== Colombia ===
- El Dorado, Meta
- El Dorado International Airport, Bogotá

=== United States ===
- El Dorado, Arkansas
- El Dorado, California
- Eldorado, Georgia
- Eldorado, Illinois
- Eldorado, Iowa
- El Dorado, Kansas
- Eldorado, Maryland
- Eldorado, Michigan
- Eldorado, Nebraska
- El Dorado, Nevada, a ghost town
- Eldorado, New Mexico, also called Eldorado, a census-designated place
- Eldorado, Ohio
- Eldorado, Oklahoma
- Eldorado, Pennsylvania
- Eldorado, Texas
- El Dorado, Houston, Texas
- Eldorado, Wisconsin, a town
- Eldorado (community), Wisconsin, an unincorporated community
- El Dorado County, California
  - El Dorado AVA, California wine region in El Dorado County
- Eldorado Glacier, Washington
- El Dorado Hills, California
- Eldorado Mountain, a summit of the Rocky Mountains near Eldorado Springs, Colorado
- Eldorado Peak, Washington
- Mountain Ranch, California, formerly El Dorado
- Eldorado River, Alaska
- Eldorado Springs, Colorado
- El Dorado Springs, Missouri
- Eldorado Township (disambiguation)

=== Elsewhere ===
- Eldorado, Victoria, Australia
- Eldorado, Sinaloa, Mexico
- El Dorado Province, San Martín Region, Peru
- Eldorado, Limpopo, South Africa
- El Dorado, Trinidad and Tobago, a town in Trinidad and Tobago
- El Dorado, Uruguay
- El Dorado, Venezuela
- Eldorado, Zimbabwe

== Arts, entertainment and media ==
=== Films ===
- El Dorado (1921 film), a French silent film by Marcel L'Herbier
- El Dorado (1963 film), an Israeli film by Menahem Golan
- El Dorado (1966 film), an American film directed by Howard Hawks starring John Wayne and Robert Mitchum
- Eldorado (1995 film), a Canadian film by Charles Binamé
- El Dorado (1988 film), a Spanish film by Carlos Saura
- The Road to El Dorado, a 2000 animated film by Bibo Bergeron and Don Paul
- Eldorado (2008 film), a Belgian film by Bouli Lanners
- Eldorado (2012 film), a British film by Richard Driscoll
- Eldorado (2018 film), a Swiss documentary
- Eldorado: Everything the Nazis Hate, a 2023 German documentary by Benjamin Cantu

=== Literature ===
- El Dorado, a 2007 verse novel by Dorothy Porter
- Eldorado (novel), 1913, part of The Scarlet Pimpernel series by Baroness Orczy
- "Eldorado" (poem), 1849, by Edgar Allan Poe
- Eldorado (poetry collection), a 1928 collection of poems by J. Slauerhoff

=== Music ===
==== Groups and labels ====
- Eldorado (band), a hard rock band from Spain
- Eldorado Recording Studios, a recording studio in Burbank, California

==== Albums ====
- Eldorado (Electric Light Orchestra album) (1974)
- El Dorado (24kGoldn album) (2021)
- El Dorado (Aterciopelados album) (1995)
- El Dorado (Shakira album) (2017)
- Eldorado (EP) (1989), an EP by Neil Young and The Restless
- Eldorado, 2007, by Stephan Eicher
- Eldorado, 2016, by Ro James
- El Dorado, 2009, by 17 Hippies
- El Dorado, 2008, by James Wilsey
- El Dorado, a 1997 soundtrack of Ace Combat 2
- El Dorado, 2020, by Marcus King

==== Songs ====
- "Eldorado" (song), 1974, by Electric Light Orchestra
- "El Dorado" (song), 2010, by Iron Maiden
- "El Dorado", a 1991 composition by John Adams
- "Eldorado" a 1994 song by Jean-Michel Jarre
- "El Dorado", by Death Cab for Cutie from Kintsugi
- "Eldorado", 1985, by Drum Theatre
- "El Dorado", 2014, by Every Time I Die from From Parts Unknown
- "El Dorado", 2005, by 50 Foot Wave from Golden Ocean
- "Eldorado", by Joseph Hinton
- "El Dorado", by Elton John from the soundtrack to The Road to El Dorado
- "El.Do.Ra.Do", 1987, by Seikima-II from From Hell with Love
- "Eldorado", 1992, by the Tragically Hip from Fully Completely
- "El Dorado", 2012, by Two Steps from Hell from SkyWorld
- "El Dorado," a 2016 song by Marillion from FEAR
- "Eldorado", 1980, by Goombay Dance Band
- "El Dorado", by EXO
- "El Dorado", 1988, by Restless Heart from Big Dreams in a Small Town
- "El Dorado (Can't Stop Now!)", by Ashley McBryde from the 2018 album Girl Going Nowhere
- "El Dorado", by Zach Bryan from his 2023 self-titled album

=== Television ===
- "Eldorado" (Boardwalk Empire), an episode of the series Boardwalk Empire
- El Dorado (Super Friends), a character in Super Friends
- Eldorado (TV series), a 1992–1993 BBC soap opera

== Brands and enterprises ==
- ElDorado (bus manufacturer), a bus company
- El Dorado Furniture, an American furniture company
- El Dorado Rum, a brand of Guyanese rum
- Eldorado Amusement Park, New Jersey, US

== Mines ==
- El Dorado Gold Mine, Fairbanks, Alaska, US
- Eldorado Mine (Northwest Territories), Port Radium, Northwest Territories, Canada
- Eldorado Mine (Saskatchewan), near Uranium City, Saskatchewan, Canada
- El Dorado mine, an iron mine near Ovalle, Chile
- El Dorado, a proposed mine project of the Pacific Rim Mining Corporation in El Salvador

== Science and technology ==
- Cray XMT or Eldorado, a supercomputer
- El Dorado, a hop variety
- Eldorado Institute, a non-profit research and development institution headquartered in Campinas, São Paulo, Brazil

== Venues ==
- Eldorado (Berlin), performance venues in Berlin, Weimar Republic
- Eldorado (theatre), former name of an historic theatre in Paris, now Théâtre libre
- Eldorado Casino, a casino in Henderson, Nevada, US
- Eldorado Resort Casino, a hotel and casino in Reno, Nevada, US

== Other uses ==
- El Dorado (Colombian football), a period of Colombian football
- El Dorado (restaurant), Puerto Vallarta, Mexico
- El Dorado (side-wheeler)
- The El Dorado, a co-op apartment building in New York City
- Cadillac Eldorado, an automobile
- Royal Merchant, British ship sank in 1641, nicknamed El Dorado of the seas

== See also ==
- El Dorado Canyon (disambiguation)
- El Dorado High School (disambiguation)
- Dorado (disambiguation)
- Helldorado (disambiguation)
