= 50 Foot Wave discography =

- Studio albums: 2
- Extended plays: 5
- Live albums: 2
- Singles: 6

This is the discography for the work of rock band 50 Foot Wave.

== Albums ==
=== Studio albums ===
Title	Album details
Golden Ocean	Released: March 8, 2005; Label: Throwing Music
Black Pearl	Released: April 15, 2022; Label: Fire Records

=== Live albums ===
Title	Album details
Live in Burbank	Released: 2004; Label: Throwing Music (only ten copies made)
Live In Seattle	Released: 2004; Label: Throwing Music (via website)

== EPs ==
Title	EP details
50 Foot Wave	Released: March 23, 2004; Label: 4AD Records/Throwing Music
Free Music!	Released: April 4, 2006; Label: Throwing Music/Reincarnate Records
Power + Light	Released: 2009; Label: Throwing Music
With Love from the Men's Room	Released: 2011; Label: Throwing Music
Bath White	Released: 2016; Label: Throwing Music

== Singles ==
Title	Year	Album
"Bug"	2004	50 Foot Wave
"Clara Bow"	2005	Golden Ocean
"Sally Is a Girl"	2005	Golden Ocean
"Hot Pink, Distorted"	2006	Free Music!
"Staring into the Sun"	2022	Black Pearl
"Hog Child"	2022	Black Pearl
