= Eldorado Mine =

Eldorado Mine may refer to:

- Eldorado Mine (Northwest Territories)
- Eldorado Mine (Saskatchewan)
- El Dorado gold mine (El Salvador)
- El Dorado Gold Mine, Alaska

== See also ==
El Dorado (disambiguation)
