= List of The L Word soundtracks =

Showtime drama The L Word has released five soundtrack compilation albums. The music composer of the show is EZgirl.

== Season 1 Soundtrack ==
Season 1 Soundtrack

Soundtrack album by Various artists
- Released: 2004
- Producers: Ilene Chaiken, Natasha Duprey, Rosie Lopez

Season 1 Soundtrack is a compilation of soundtracks from the Showtime show The L Word. It features songs that were used as soundtracks from its first season.

It was released in 2004, the same year as the show's premiere.

=== Critical reception ===
On AllMusic, Stephen Thomas Erlewine wrote, "The soundtrack to Showtime's lesbian answer to Sex and the City is much like the show itself — classy, upscale, sophisticated, well-intentioned, and in good taste, but overly earnest and is lacking a sense of humor.... As such, it's not bad as background music, but it's not compelling listening on its own terms, even if it captures the sound and feel of the show quite well."

=== Track listing ===
1. The Murmurs - "Genius".
2. Lucinda Williams - "Right in Time".
3. Ella Fitzgerald - "Let's Do It, Let's Fall in Love"
4. Fantcha - "Sol Ja Camba"
5. Joan Armatrading - "The Weakness In Me"
6. Connie Francis - "Everybody's Somebody's Fool"
7. Shelley Campbell - "Drivin' You"
8. The Be Good Tanyas - "In Spite of the Damage"
9. Rufus Wainwright - "Hallelujah"
10. Kinnie Starr - "Sun again"
11. Jason Collett - "Blue Sky"
12. Marianne Faithfull - "The Pleasure Song"
13. Joseph Arthur - "In The Sun"
14. Frances Faye - "Frances and Her Friends"

== The L Word Season 2 CD ==
The L Word Season 2 CD

Soundtrack album by Various artists
- Released: 2005
- Producers: Ilene Chaiken, EZgirl, Natasha Duprey, Rosie Lopez

The L Word Season 2 CD is the second soundtrack album from the show The L Word. It features the songs that appeared in its second season plus the theme song of the show's opening credits and a duet of the actress and singer Pam Grier (who stars in the show as Kit Porter) and the theme song authors Betty.

=== Critical reception ===
On AllMusic, Heather Phares said, "Spanning club-friendly dance-pop, confessional singer/songwriters and classic pop, the soundtrack to The L Word: The Second Season showcases the series' eclectic taste in music.... A hipper and more contemporary collection than the first season's soundtrack, [it] works well both in and out of the show's context."

=== Track listing ===
1. Dusty Springfield - "Just a Little Lovin'"
2. The Organ - "Brother"
3. Ladytron - "Playgirl"
4. Martina Topley-Bird - "Llya"
5. Heart - "No Other Love"
6. Grandadbob - "Mmmmnn"
7. Shawn Colvin - "Sunny Came Home"
8. Le Tigre - "On the Verge"
9. Iron & Wine - "Naked As We Came"
10. Dirtmitts - "Get On (DJ Lester Remix)"
11. Betty - "It Girl"
12. Shirley Bassey and awayTEAM - "Where Do I Begin"
13. Jane Siberry - "Love is Everything (Harmony Version)"
14. Pam Grier & Betty - "Some Kind of Wonderful" (Bonus Track)
15. Betty - "The L Word Theme" (Bonus Track)
16. The Jealous Girlfriends - "Lay Around"

== Season 3 Soundtrack ==
Season 3 Soundtrack

Soundtrack album by Various artists
- Released: 2006
- Producers: Ilene Chaiken, EZgirl, Natasha Duprey, Rosie Lopez

Season 3 Soundtrack is the double disc compilation album of the soundtrack of The L Word's third season. Two discs with the songs that appeared as soundtrack on the third season and 5 songs which the original artists played themselves live on the show.

=== Critical reception ===
On Edge Media Network, Melissa Bourgeois wrote, "The L Word Season 3 Soundtrack ranges from sultry jazz and lounge, to high energy dance and rock. Like in the show, girrrls dominate on this soundtrack, leaving D'Angelo to be the lone male rep, swimming in a sea of estrogen.... Overall, go for it. Both well-known and lesser-known artists are represented, most likely giving you the opportunity to tread new waters."

=== Track listing ===
Disc 1

1. Télépopmusik - "Don't Look Back"
2. Tegan and Sara - "Love Type Thing" (Live On Show EXCLUSIVE)
3. Tracy Bonham - "Naked" (Live On Show)
4. Jahna - "Flower Duet From Lakme" (Live On Show)
5. D'Angelo - "Feel Like Makin' Love"
6. Nona Hendryx, Pam Grier, Betty - "Transformation" (Live On Show)
7. Cory Lee - "The Naughty Song (Extended)"
8. Catlow - "Kiss The World"
9. Sleater-Kinney - "Jumpers" (Live On Show)
10. Magneta Lane - "The Constant Lover"
11. The Gossip - "Standing In The Way Of Control (Le Tigre Remix)"
12. Betty - "Jesus" (EXCLUSIVE)
13. Shivaree - "I Will Go Quietly"

Disc 2

1. Lorraine Lawson - "The Rules Of The Game"
2. Maria Muldaur - "It Ain't the Meat (It's the Motion)"
3. Frazey Ford - "In My Time Of Dying" (EXCLUSIVE)
4. Maggie Moore & Yvette Narlock - "Lady Loves Me" (EXCLUSIVE)
5. Eldorado - "Jaded Julie"
6. TraLaLa - "All Fired Up"
7. Tracy Bonham - "Whether You Fall"
8. Esthero - "I Drive Alone"
9. Tegan and Sara - "So Jealous"
10. Amy Cook - "Million Holes In Heaven"
11. Neko Case & Her Boyfriends - "Porchlight"

== L Tunes: Music from and inspired by The L Word ==
L Tunes: Music from and inspired by The L Word

Compilation album by Various artists
- Released: 2007
- Producers: Ilene Chaiken, EZgirl

L Tunes: Music from and inspired by The L Word is a compilation album of songs inspired in the Showtime show The L Word and some of its soundtracks.

=== Track listing ===
1. Kirsten Price - "Magic Tree"
2. Goldfrapp - "Ride A White Horse"
3. Fiona Apple - "Sleep To Dream"
4. Prototypes - "Je Ne Te Connais Pas"
5. Johnny Boy - "15 Minutes"
6. Pink - "Long Way To Happy"
7. Kelis - "Living Proof"
8. Da Brat feat. Cherish - "In Luv Wit Chu"
9. PJ Harvey - "Down By The Water"
10. Nina Simone - "Do I Move You (Version II)"
11. Tori Amos - "A Sorta Fairytale"
12. The Cliks - "Complicated"
13. Peaches - "Boys Wanna Be Her"
14. Betty - "Barnyard"
15. Slipknot - "Blister Exists" (not in the Soundtrack)

== The L Word: Final Season ==
The L Word: Final Season

Compilation album by Various artists
- Released: 2009
- Recorded: 2008 and 2009
- Genre: Pop
- Label: Avatar Records
- Producers: Ilene Chaiken, Larry Robinson

The L Word: Final Season is a compilation album of songs that were used in the last season of the Showtime show The L Word. It was released by Avatar Records in 2009 worldwide exclusively through iTunes.

=== Track listing ===
1. Reni Lane - "Place For Us"
2. Nettie Rose - "Camera Whore"
3. Costanza - "I've Been Waiting For You"
4. Carla Thomas - "I've Just Been Feeling Bad"
5. Jaymes Bullett - "Sugar High"
6. The Charmless Heart - "The City Sleeps"
7. Tilly and the Wall - "Beat Control"
8. Client - "Your Love is Like Petrol"
9. Justine Elektra - "Killalady"
10. Sharleen Spiteri - "Don't Keep Me Waiting"
11. Gabriella Cilmi - "Awkward Game"
12. Holly Palmer - "Fool #1"
13. Jill Barber - "Never Quit Loving You"
