= Clara Bow =

American actress (1905–1965)

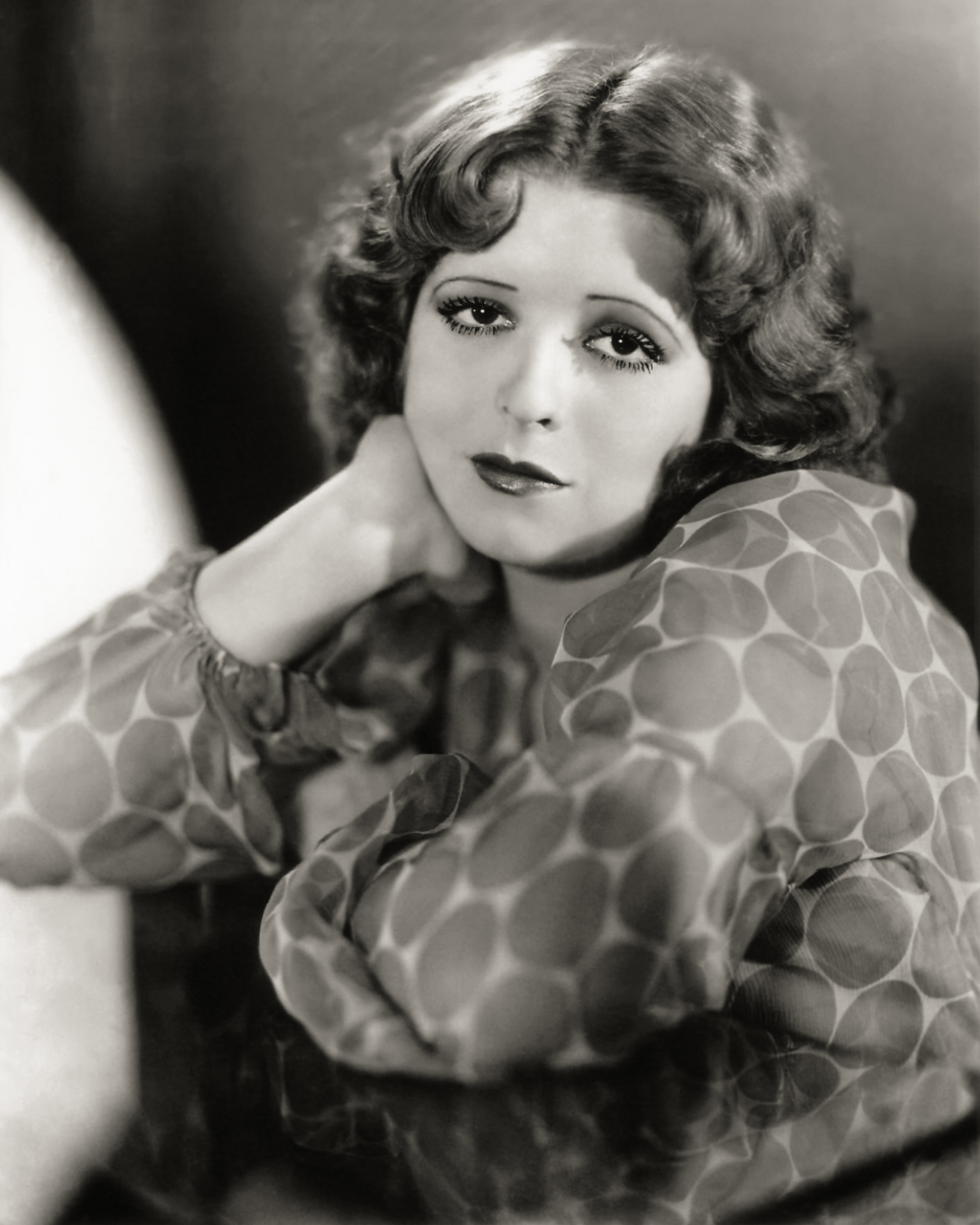
- Bow in 1932
- Born: Clara Gordon Bow; July 29, 1905; New York City, U.S.
- Died: September 27, 1965 (aged 60); Culver City, California, U.S.
- Resting place: Forest Lawn Memorial Park
- Other name: "The 'It' Girl"
- Occupation: Actress
- Years active: 1921–1933
- Spouse: Rex Bell (m. 1931; died 1962)
- Children: 2

Clara Gordon Bow (/boʊ/; July 29, 1905 – September 27, 1965) was an American actress who rose to stardom during the silent film era of the 1920s and successfully made the transition to "talkies" in 1929. Her appearance as a plucky shopgirl in the 1927 film It brought her global fame and the nickname "The It Girl". Bow came to personify the Roaring Twenties and is described as its leading sex symbol.

Bow appeared in 58 films, all but 11 of which were silent. Thirty-three are extant in their entirety, 14 are partially lost, and 11 are completely lost. Some hits include Mantrap (1926), It (1927), and Wings (1927). She was named the first box-office draw in 1928 and 1929 and the second box-office draw in 1927 and 1930. Her presence in a motion picture was said to have ensured investors, by odds of almost two-to-one, a "safe return". At the apex of her stardom, she received more than 45,000 fan letters in a single month, in January 1929.

After marrying actor Rex Bell in 1931, Bow retired from acting in 1933. Her final film, Hoop-La, was released in 1933. She then became a rancher in Nevada. Bow had two children. In September 1965, Bow died of a heart attack at the age of 60.

== Early life ==
Bow was born in the Prospect Heights section of Brooklyn, New York City, at 697 Bergen Street, in a "bleak, sparsely furnished room above [a] dilapidated Baptist Church". Her birth year, according to the US censuses of 1910 and 1920, was 1905. In US census records, enumerated April 15, 1910, and January 7, 1920, Bow's age is stated 4 and 14 years, respectively. The 1930 census stated an age of 23. Bow was her parents' third child. Her two older sisters, born in 1903 and 1904, had died in infancy. Her mother, Sarah Frances Bow (née Gordon, 1880–1923), was told by a doctor not to become pregnant again for fear the next baby might die as well. Despite the warning, Sarah became pregnant with Clara in late 1904. In addition to the risky pregnancy, a heat wave besieged New York in July 1905, and temperatures peaked around 100 °F (38 °C). Years later, Clara wrote: "I don't suppose two people ever looked death in the face more clearly than my mother and I the morning I was born. We were both given up, but somehow we struggled back to life."

Bow's parents were descended from English and Scots-Irish immigrants who had come to America the generation before. Bow said that her father, Robert Walter Bow (1874–1959), "had a quick, keen mind... all the natural qualifications to make something of himself, but didn't... everything seemed to go wrong for him, poor darling." By the time Clara was four and a half, her father was out of work. Between 1905 and 1923, the family lived at 14 different addresses, but seldom outside Prospect Heights, with Clara's father often absent. "I do not think my mother ever loved my father," she said. "He knew it. And it made him very unhappy, for he worshipped her always."

When Bow's mother was 16, she fell from a second-story window and suffered a severe head injury. She was later diagnosed with "psychosis due to epilepsy". (Note: This was a condition apart from the seizures known to cause disordered thinking, delusion, paranoia, and aggressive behavior.) From her earliest years, Bow had learned how to care for her mother during the seizures, as well as how to deal with her psychotic and hostile episodes. She said her mother could be "mean to me—and she often was," but "she didn't mean to be and that it was because she couldn't help it." Still, Bow felt deprived of her childhood; "As a kid I took care of my mother, she didn't take care of me".

Sarah worsened gradually, and when she realized her daughter was set for a movie career, Bow's mother told her she "would be much better off dead." One night in February 1922, Bow awoke to a butcher knife held against her throat by her mother. Clara was able to fend off the attack and locked her mother in her room. In the morning, Bow's mother had no recollection of the episode. Later, she was committed to a sanitarium by Robert Bow.

Clara spoke about the incident later:

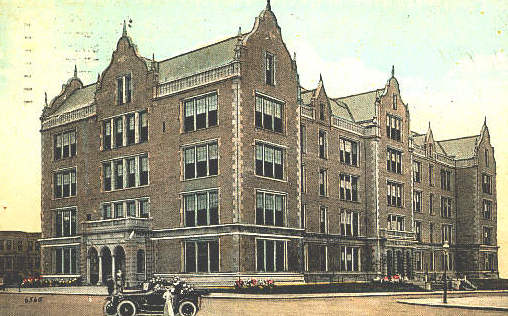
Bay Ridge High in a 1920 postcard

It was snowing. My mother and I were cold and hungry. We had been cold and hungry for days. We lay in each other's arms and cried and tried to keep warm. It grew worse and worse. So that night my mother—but I can't tell you about it. Only when I remember it, it seems to me I can't live.

According to Bow's biographer, David Stenn, Bow was raped by her father at age sixteen while her mother was institutionalized. On January 5, 1923, Sarah died at the age of 43 from her epilepsy. When relatives gathered for the funeral, Bow was so upset that she "went crazy" and tried to jump into the grave to be with her, shouting that they were "hypocrites" and that they hadn't loved or cared for her mother while she was alive.

Bow attended P.S. 111, P.S. 9, and P.S. 98. (Note: "P.S." stands for "Public School" in New York City.) As she grew up, she felt shy among other girls, who teased her for her worn-out clothes and "carrot-top" hair. She said about her childhood, "I never had any clothes ... And lots of time didn't have anything to eat. We just lived, that's about all. Girls shunned me because I was so poorly dressed."

From first grade, Bow preferred the company of boys, stating, "I could lick any boy my size. My right arm was quite famous. My right arm was developed from pitching so much ... Once I hopped a ride on behind a big fire engine. I got a lot of credit from the gang for that." A close friend, a younger boy who lived in her building, burned to death, something that haunted her. She heard his screams and ran to his aid, rolling him up in carpet to stop the fire, but he died in her arms. In 1919, Bow enrolled in Bay Ridge High School for Girls. "I wore sweaters and old skirts ... didn't want to be treated like a girl". Her mother had a long spell of good health and changed Bow's appearance, cutting her hair more femininely. Bow said that "there was one boy who had always been my pal ... he kissed me ... I wasn't sore. I didn't get indignant. I was horrified and hurt ... I knew I could never go back to being a tomboy."

Bow's interest in sports and her physical abilities led her to plan for a career as an athletics instructor. She won five medals at the cinder tracks and credited her cousin Homer Baker—the national half-mile (c. 800 m) champion in 1913 and 1914 and 660-yard (c. 600 m) world-record holder—for being her trainer. The Bows and Bakers shared a house—still standing—at 33 Prospect Place in 1920.

== Career ==
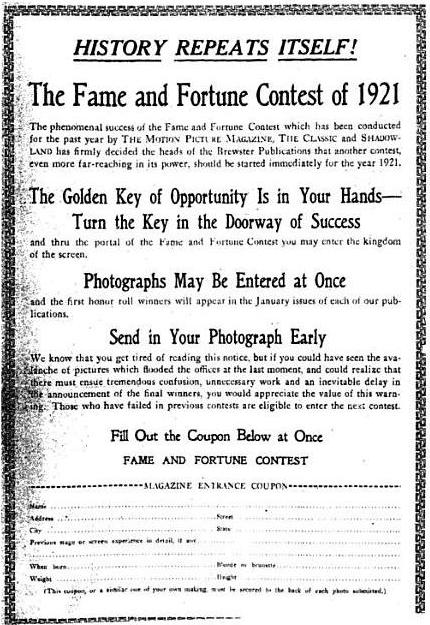
"Fame and Fortune" contest form

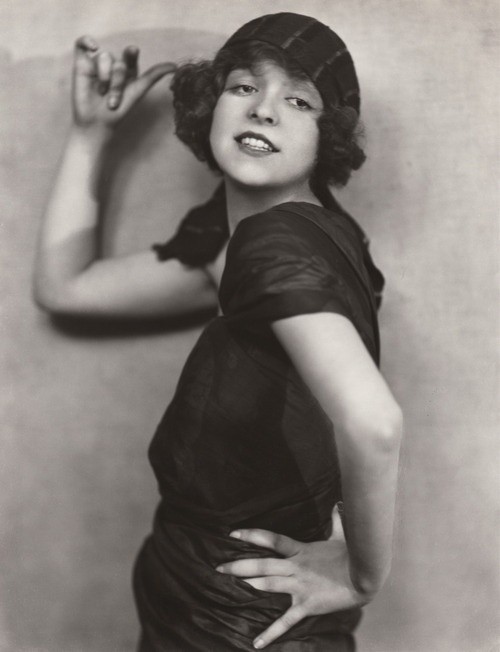
Bow in 1921

=== 1921–1922: Early years ===
In the early 1920s, roughly 50 million Americans—half the population at that time—attended the movies every week. As Bow grew into womanhood, her stature as a "boy" in her old gang became "impossible". She did not have any girlfriends, school was a "heartache," and her home was "miserable". On the silver screen, she found consolation; "For the first time in my life I knew there was beauty in the world. For the first time I saw distant lands, serene, lovely homes, romance, nobility, glamor." And further; "I always had a queer feeling about actors and actresses on the screen ... I knew I would have done it differently. I couldn't analyze it, but I could always feel it." "I'd go home and be a one girl circus, taking the parts of everyone I'd seen, living them before the glass." At 16, Bow says she "knew" she wanted to be a motion picture actress, even if she was a "square, awkward, funny-faced kid."

Against her mother's wishes but with her father's support, Bow competed in Brewster publications' magazine's annual nationwide acting contest, "Fame and Fortune", in fall 1921. In previous years, other contest winners had found work in the movies. In the contest's final screen test, Bow was up against an already scene-experienced woman who did "a beautiful piece of acting". A set member later stated that when Bow did the scene, she actually became her character and "lived it". In the January issues 1922 of Motion Picture Classic, the contest jury, Howard Chandler Christy, Neysa McMein, and Harrison Fisher, concluded:

She is very young, only 16. But she is full of confidence, determination and ambition. She is endowed with a mentality far beyond her years. She has a genuine spark of divine fire. The five different screen tests she had showed this very plainly; her emotional range of expression provoked a fine enthusiasm from every contest judge who saw the tests. She screens perfectly. Her personal appearance is almost enough to carry her to success without the aid of the brains she indubitably possesses.

Bow won an evening gown and a silver trophy, and the publisher committed to help her "gain a role in films", but nothing happened. Bow's father told her to "haunt" Brewster's office, located in Brooklyn, until they came up with something. "To get rid of me, or maybe they really meant to (give me) all the time and were just busy", Bow was introduced to director Christy Cabanne, who cast her in Beyond the Rainbow, produced late 1921 in New York City and released February 19, 1922. Bow did five scenes and impressed Cabanne with her ability to produce tears on cue, but was cut from the final print. "I was sick to my stomach," she recalled, and thought her mother was right about the movie business.

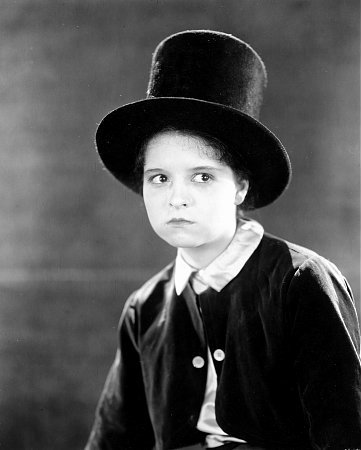
Bow undercover in Down to the Sea in Ships, 1922

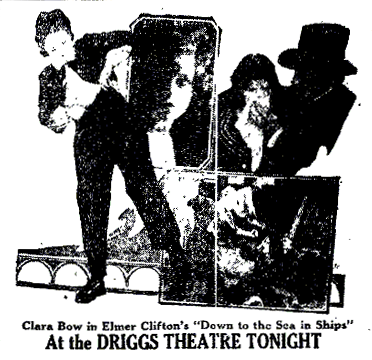
Bow singled out in a newspaper ad for Ships, 1923

Bow dropped out of school in her senior year after she was notified about winning the "Fame and Fortune Contest", possibly in October 1921, and got an ordinary office job. However, movie ads and newspaper editorial comments from 1922 to 1923 suggest that Bow was not cut from Beyond the Rainbow.

=== 1922–1924: Early silent films ===
Encouraged by her father, Bow continued to visit studio agencies asking for parts. "But there was always something. I was too young, or too little, or too fat. Usually, I was too fat." Eventually, director Elmer Clifton needed a tomboy for his movie Down to the Sea in Ships, saw Bow in Motion Picture Classic magazine, and sent for her. In an attempt to overcome her youthful looks, Bow put her hair up and arrived in a dress she "sneaked" from her mother. Clifton said she was too old, but broke into laughter as the stammering Bow made him believe she was the girl in the magazine. Clifton decided to take Bow with him and offered her $35 a week. Bow held out for $50 and Clifton agreed, but he could not say whether she would "fit the part". Bow later learned that one of Brewsters' subeditors had urged Clifton to give her a chance.

Down to the Sea in Ships, shot on location in New Bedford, Massachusetts, and produced by independent "The Whaling Film Corporation", documented life, love, and work in the whale-hunter community. The production relied on a few lesser-known actors and local talents. It premiered at the Olympia Theater in New Bedford, on September 25, 1922, and went on general distribution on March 4, 1923. Bow was billed 10th in the film, but shone through:

- "Miss Bow will undoubtedly gain fame as a screen comedienne."
- "Clara Bow who has reached the front rank of motion picture principal player ... [has] scored a tremendous hit in Down To The Sea In Ships."
- "With her beauty, her brains, her personality and her genuine acting ability, it should not be many moons before she enjoys stardom in the fullest sense of the word. You must see Down to the Sea in Ships."
- "In movie parlance, she 'stole' the picture ..."

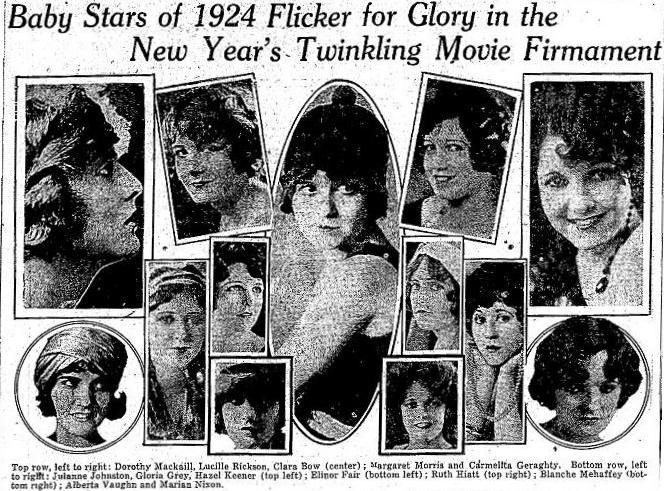
Bow was chosen the foremost "baby" by WAMPAS.

Cartooned: Bow as "Orchid McGonigle" in Grit, having a hard time keeping her boyfriend "Kid Hart" (Glenn Hunter) on track

By mid-December 1923, primarily due to her merits in Down to the Sea in Ships, Bow was chosen the most successful of the 1924 WAMPAS Baby Stars. Three months before Down to the Sea in Ships was released, Bow danced on a table uncredited in Enemies of Women (1923). During the year, she made a short film, The Pill Pounder (1923). In spring, Bow got a part in The Daring Years (1923), where she befriended actress Mary Carr, who taught her how to use make-up. In the summer, she got a "tomboy" part in Grit, a story that dealt with juvenile crime and was written by F. Scott Fitzgerald. Bow met her first boyfriend, cameraman Arthur Jacobson, and she got to know director Frank Tuttle, with whom she worked in five later productions. Tuttle remembered:

Her emotions were close to the surface. She could cry on demand, opening the floodgate of tears almost as soon as I asked her to weep. She was dynamite, full of nervous energy and vitality and pitifully eager to please everyone.

Grit was released on January 7, 1924. The Variety review said, "Clara Bow lingers in the eye, long after the picture has gone." While shooting Grit at Pyramid Studios, in Astoria, New York, Bow was approached by Jack Bachman of independent Hollywood studio Preferred Pictures. He wanted to contract her for a three-month trial, fare paid, and $50 a week. "It can't do any harm," he said. "Why can't I stay in New York and make movies?" Bow asked her father, but he told her not to worry. On July 21, 1923, she befriended Louella Parsons, who interviewed her for the New York Morning Telegraph. In 1931, when Bow came under tabloid scrutiny, Parsons defended her and stuck to her first opinion on Bow:

She is as refreshingly unaffected as if she had never faced a means to pretend. She hasn't any secrets from the world, she trusts everyone ... she is almost too good to be true ... (I) only wish some reformer who believes the screen contaminates all who associate with it could meet this child. Still, on second thought, it might not be safe: Clara uses a dangerous pair of eyes.

The interview also revealed that Bow already was cast in Maytime and liked chop suey restaurants.

=== 1923–1925: Preferred Pictures ===
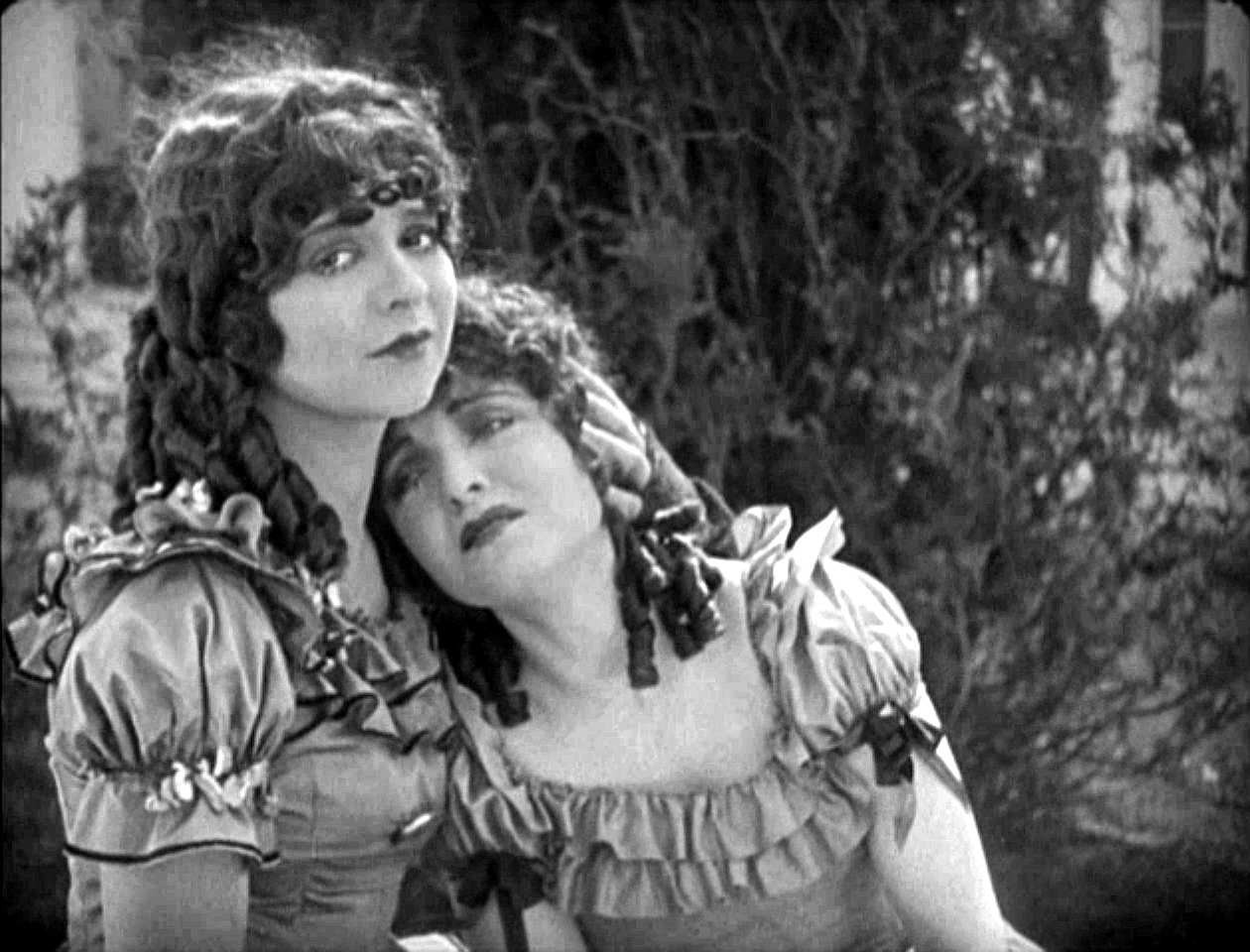
Bow comforting Ethel Shannon in Maytime (1923), which had been classified as a lost film until a partial copy was found in New Zealand in 2009

On July 22, 1923, Bow left New York, her father, and her boyfriend behind for Hollywood. As chaperone for the journey and her subsequent southern California stay, the studio appointed writer and agent Maxine Alton, whom Bow later branded a liar. In late July, Bow entered the office of studio chief B. P. Schulberg wearing a simple high-school uniform in which she "had won several gold medals on the cinder track". She was tested and a press release from early August says Bow had become a member of Preferred Pictures' "permanent stock".

Bow signed with Preferred Pictures, also working with other studios. Alton and Bow rented an apartment at The Hillview near Hollywood Boulevard. Preferred Pictures was run by Schulberg, who had started as a publicity manager at Famous Players–Lasky, but in the aftermath of the power struggle around the formation of United Artists, ended up on the losing side and lost his job. He founded Preferred in 1919 as a result, at the age of 27.

Maytime was Bow's first Hollywood picture, an adaptation of the operetta Maytime, in which she played Alice Tremaine. Before the film was finished, Schulberg announced that Bow was given the lead in the studio's upcoming film Poisoned Paradise. But first she was lent to First National Pictures to co-star in the adaptation of Gertrude Atherton's 1923 best seller Black Oxen, shot in October, and to co-star with Colleen Moore in Painted People, shot in November.

Black Oxen director Frank Lloyd was casting for the part of high-society flapper Janet Oglethorpe, and more than 50 women auditioned, most with previous screen experience. Bow reminisced: "but he had not found exactly what he wanted and finally somebody suggested me to him ... When I came into his office a big smile came over his face and he looked just tickled to death." Lloyd told the press, "Bow is the personification of the ideal aristocratic flapper, mischievous, pretty, aggressive, quick-tempered and deeply sentimental." It was released on January 4, 1924.

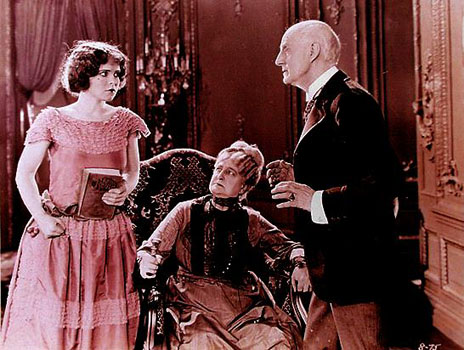
Bow as Janet, the "horrid" flapper in Black Oxen (1923), holding Flaming Youth to her chest; with Kate Lester and Tom Ricketts

"The flapper, impersonated by a young actress, Clara Bow, ... had five speaking titles, and every one of them was so entirely in accord with the character and the mood of the scene that it drew a laugh from what, in film circles, is termed a 'hard-boiled' audience." The Los Angeles Times commented that "Clara Bow, the prize vulgarian of the lot... was amusing and spirited but she never belonged in the picture". Variety said that "the horrid little flapper is adorably played".

Colleen Moore made her flapper debut in a successful adaptation of the daring novel Flaming Youth, released November 12, 1923, six weeks before Black Oxen. Both films were produced by First National Pictures, and while Black Oxen was still being edited and Flaming Youth not yet released, Bow was requested to co-star with Moore as her kid sister in Painted People (The Swamp Angel). Moore essayed the baseball-playing tomboy and Bow, according to Moore, said "I don't like my part, I wanna play yours."

Moore, a well-established star earning $1200 a week—Bow got $200—took offense and blocked the director from shooting close-ups of Bow. Moore was married to the film's producer and Bow's protests were futile. "I'll get that bitch", she told her boyfriend Jacobson, who had arrived from New York. Bow had sinus problems and decided to have them attended to that very evening. With Bow's face now in bandages, the studio had no choice but to recast her part.

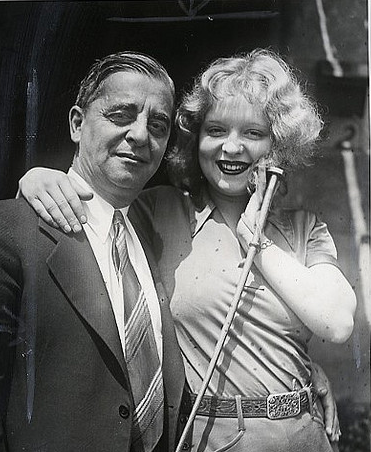
Clara Bow in 1931 with her father, Robert, who married Clara's friend, Mary Lorraine Tui (Tui Lorraine) at Clara's insistence

In May, Moore renewed her efforts in The Perfect Flapper, produced by her husband. Despite good reviews she suddenly withdrew. "No more flappers ... they have served their purpose ... people are tired of soda-pop love affairs", she told the Los Angeles Times, which had commented a month earlier, "Clara Bow is the one outstanding type. She has almost immediately been elected for all the recent flapper parts". In November 1933, looking back to this period of her career, Bow described the atmosphere in Hollywood as like a scene from a movie about the French Revolution, where "women are hollering and waving pitchforks twice as violently as any of the guys ... the only ladies in sight are the ones getting their heads cut off."

By New Year 1924 Bow had defied the possessive Maxine Alton and brought her father to Hollywood. Bow remembered their reunion: "I didn't care a rap, for (her), nor B. P. Schulberg, nor my motion picture career, nor Clara Bow, I just threw myself into his arms and kissed and kissed him, and we both cried like a couple of fool kids. Oh, it was wonderful." Bow felt "Mrs Smith", the pseudonym Alton used, had misused her trust: "She wanted to keep a hold on me so she made me think I wasn't getting over and that nothing but her clever management kept me going."

Bow and her father moved in at 1714 North Kingsley Drive in Hollywood, together with Jacobson, who by then also worked for Preferred. When Schulberg learned of this arrangement, he fired Jacobson for potentially getting "his big star" into a scandal. When Bow found out, "She tore up her contract and threw it in his face and told him he couldn't run her private life." Jacobson concluded, "[Clara] was the sweetest girl in the world, but you didn't cross her and you didn't do her wrong." On September 7, 1924, The Los Angeles Times, in a significant article "A dangerous little devil is Clara, impish, appealing, but oh, how she can act!", her father is titled "business manager" and Jacobson referred to as her brother.

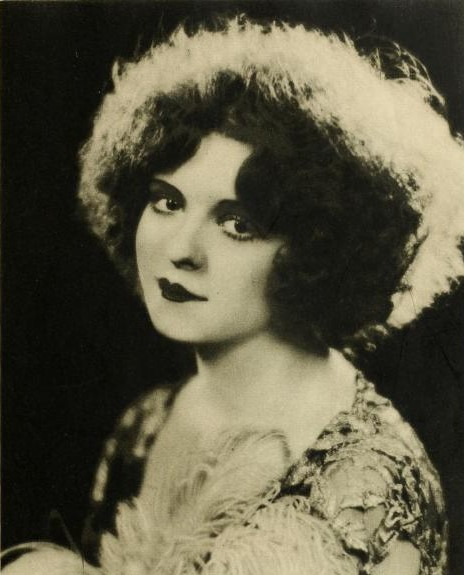
Bow in Stars of the Photoplay, 1924

Bow appeared in eight releases in 1924; two were released the same day. In Poisoned Paradise, released on February 29, 1924, Bow got her first lead; "the clever little newcomer whose work wins fresh recommendations with every new picture in which she appears". Atypical of that time, her character, "skilled in the art of self-defense, preparedness and all the other devices with which the modern flapper is endowed," fearlessly beats off the villain. In Daughters of Pleasure, also released on February 29, 1924, Bow and Marie Prevost "flapped unhampered as flappers De luxe ... I wish somebody could star Clara Bow. I'm sure her 'infinite variety' would keep her from wearying us no matter how many scenes she was in."

Lent out to Universal, Bow top-starred, for the first time, in the prohibition, bootleg drama/comedy Wine, released on August 20, 1924. The picture exposes the widespread liquor traffic in the upper classes, and Bow portrays an innocent girl who develops into a wild "red-hot mama", "a naughty, inebriated flapper". Carl Sandburg reviewed it on September 29 saying; "If not taken as information, it is cracking good entertainment". Alma Whitaker of the Los Angeles Times observed on September 7, 1924:

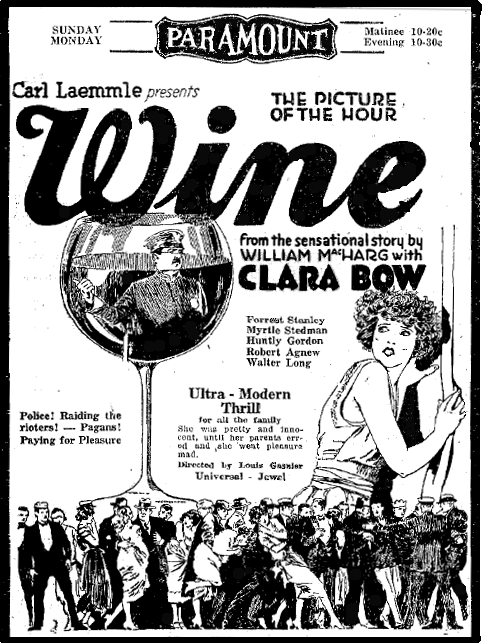
Bow's first lead role was in Wine (1924), a seven-reel feature currently classified as lost by the Library of Congress

She radiates sex appeal tempered with an impish sense of humor ... She hennas her blond hair so that it will photograph dark in the pictures ... Her social decorum is of that natural, good-natured, pleasantly informal kind ... She can act on or off the screen—takes a joyous delight in accepting a challenge to vamp any selected male—the more unpromising specimen the better. When the hapless victim is scared into speechlessness, she gurgles with naughty delight and tries another.

Bow remembered: "All this time I was 'running wild', I guess, in the sense of trying to have a good time ... maybe this was a good thing, because I suppose a lot of that excitement, that joy of life, got onto the screen." In 1925, Bow appeared in 14 productions: six for her contract owner, Preferred Pictures, and eight as an "out-loan". Motion Picture Classic magazine wrote in June that "Clara Bow ... shows alarming symptoms of becoming the sensation of the year", and featured her on the cover.

I'm almost never satisfied with myself or my work or anything ... by the time I'm ready to be a great star I'll have been on the screen such a long time that everybody will be tired of seeing me ... (Tears filled her big round eyes and threatened to fall).

I worked in two and even three pictures at once. I played all sorts of parts in all sorts of pictures ... It was very hard at the time and I used to be worn out and cry myself to sleep from sheer fatigue after 18 hours a day on different sets, but now [Early 1928] I am glad of it.

Preferred Pictures loaned Bow to producers "for sums ranging from $1500 to $2000 a week" while paying Bow a salary of $200 to $750 a week. The studio, like any other independent studio or theater at that time, was under attack from "The Big Three", MPAA, which had formed a trust to block out Independents and enforce the monopolistic studio system. On October 21, 1925, Schulberg filed Preferred Pictures for bankruptcy, with debts at $820,774 and assets $1,420.

Three days later it was announced that Schulberg would join with Adolph Zukor to become associate producer of Paramount Pictures, "catapulted into this position because he had Clara Bow under personal contract".

Adolph Zukor, Paramount Picture CEO, wrote in his memoirs: "All the skill of directors and all the booming of press-agent drums will not make a star. Only the audiences can do it. We study audience reactions with great care." Adela Rogers St. Johns had a different take. In 1950, she wrote, "If ever a star was made by public demand, it was Clara Bow." Louise Brooks in 1980 stated: "[Bow] became a star without nobody's help".

The Plastic Age was Bow's final effort for Preferred Pictures and her biggest hit up to that time. Bow starred as the good-bad college girl, Cynthia Day, against Donald Keith. It was shot on location at Pomona College in the summer of 1925, and released on December 15. Due to block booking, it was not shown in New York until July 21, 1926. Photoplay was displeased: "The college atmosphere is implausible and Clara Bow is not our idea of a college girl." Theater owners were happy, the manager of The Liberty Theater saying that "The picture is the biggest sensation we ever had in our theater ... It is 100 per cent at the box-office." Some critics felt Bow had conquered new territory, "[Bow] presents a whimsical touch to her work that adds greater laurels to her fast ascending star of screen popularity." Time singled out Bow, complimenting her on saving the picture as, "Only the amusing and facile acting of Clara Bow rescues the picture from the limbo of the impossible."

Bow began to date her co-star Gilbert Roland, who became her first fiancé. In June 1925, Bow was credited for being the first to wear hand-painted legs in public, and was reported to have many followers at the Californian beaches. Throughout the 1920s, Bow played with gender conventions and sexuality in her public image. Along with her tomboy and flapper roles, she starred in boxing films and posed for promotional photographs as a boxer. By appropriating traditionally androgynous or masculine traits, Bow presented herself as a confident, modern woman.

=== 1925–1928: Paramount Pictures ===
Bow appeared in eight releases in 1926: five for Paramount, including the film version of the musical Kid Boots with Eddie Cantor, and three loan-outs that had been filmed in 1925. In late 1925, Bow returned to New York to co-star in the Ibsenesque drama Dancing Mothers, as the good/bad "flapperish" upper-class daughter Kittens. Alice Joyce starred as her dancing mother, with Conway Tearle as "bad-boy" Naughton. The picture was released on March 1, 1926. Local reviews were very positive; "Clara Bow, known as the screen's perfect flapper, does her stuff as the child, and does it well", and "her remarkable performance in Dancing Mothers ... ". Louise Brooks remembered her in Brownlow's book; "She was absolutely sensational in the United States ... in Dancing Mothers ... she just swept the country ... I know I saw her ... and I thought ... wonderful."

On April 12, 1926, Bow signed her first contract with Paramount: "to retain your services as an actress for the period of six months from June 6, 1926 to December 6, 1926, at a salary of $750.00 per week". Bow negotiated her Paramount contract to not have a morals clause. In Victor Fleming's comedy-triangle Mantrap Bow, as Alverna the manicurist, cures lonely hearts Joe Easter (Ernest Torrence) of the great northern, as well as pill-popping New York divorce attorney runaway Ralph Prescott (Percy Marmont). Bow commented: "[Alverna] ... was bad in the book, but—darn it!—of course, they couldn't make her that way in the picture. So I played her as a flirt."

The film was released on July 24, 1926, to rave reviews. Variety said that "Clara Bow just walks away with the picture from the moment she walks into camera range", while Photoplay told readers that "When she is on the screen nothing else matters. When she is off, the same is true." Carl Sandburg wrote that it was "The smartest and swiftest work as yet seen from Miss Clara Bow." and Sam Carver of the Newman Theater was quoted in The Reel Journal as saying that "Clara Bow is taking the place of Gloria Swanson...(and)...filling a long need for a popular taste movie actress."

On August 16, 1926, Bow's agreement with Paramount was renewed into a five-year deal: "Her salary will start at $1700 a week and advance yearly to $4000 a week for the last year." Bow added that she intended to leave the motion picture business at the expiration of the contract, i.e., in 1931. In 1927 Bow appeared in six Paramount releases: It, Children of Divorce, Rough House Rosie, Wings, Hula and Get Your Man. In the Cinderella based story It, the poor shop-girl Betty Lou Spence (Bow) conquers the heart of her employer Cyrus Waltham (Antonio Moreno). The personal quality—"It"— provides the magic to make it happen. The film gave Bow her nickname, "The 'It' Girl". Reviews were nothing less than outstanding: The New York Times said that "(Bow)...is vivacious and, as Betty Lou, saucy, which perhaps is one of the ingredients of It."

The Film Daily wrote that "Clara Bow gets a real chance and carries it off with honors...(and)...she is really the whole show", and Variety said "You can't get away from this Clara Bow girl. She certainly has that certain 'It'...and she just runs away with the film." Carl Sandburg wrote that "'It' is smart, funny and real. It makes a full-sized star of Clara Bow." Dorothy Parker is often said to have referred to Bow when she wrote, "It, hell; she had Those." Parker in actuality was not referring to Bow or to Bow's character in the film It, but to a different character, Ava Cleveland, in the novel of the same name.

In 1927, Bow starred in Wings, a war picture rewritten to accommodate her, as she was Paramount's biggest star, but was not happy about her part: "[Wings is]...a man's picture and I'm just the whipped cream on top of the pie." The film went on to win the first Academy Award for Best Picture. In 1928, Bow appeared in four Paramount releases: Red Hair, Ladies of the Mob, The Fleet's In, and Three Week-Ends, all of which are lost apart from a 1-minute fragment of Red Hair and a 1-2 minute fragment from Three Week-Ends.

Adela Rogers St. Johns, a noted screenwriter who had done a number of pictures with Bow, wrote about her:

[T]here seems to be no pattern, no purpose to her life. She swings from one emotion to another, but she gains nothing, stores up nothing for the future. She lives entirely in the present, not even for today, but in the moment. Clara is the total nonconformist. What she wants she gets, if she can. What she desires to do she does. She has a big heart, a remarkable brain, and the most utter contempt for the world in general. Time doesn't exist for her, except that she thinks it will stop tomorrow. She has real courage, because she lives boldly. Who are we, after all, to say she is wrong?

Bow's bohemian lifestyle and "dreadful" manners were considered reminders of the Hollywood elite's uneasy position in high society. Bow fumed: "They yell at me to be dignified. But what are the dignified people like? The people who are held up as examples for me? They are snobs. Frightful snobs ... I'm a curiosity in Hollywood. I'm a big freak, because I'm myself!" MGM executive Paul Bern said Bow was "the greatest emotional actress on the screen, ... she is sentimental, simple, childish and sweet and the hard-boiled attitude is a defense mechanism."

"Rehearsals sap my pep", Bow explained in November 1929, and from the beginning of her career she relied on immediate direction: "Tell me what I have to do and I'll do it." Bow was keen on poetry and music, but according to Rogers St. Johns, her attention span did not allow her to appreciate novels. Bow's focal point was the scene, and her creativity made directors call in extra cameras to cover her spontaneous actions, rather than holding her down.

Years after Bow left Hollywood, director Victor Fleming compared Bow to a Stradivarius violin: "Touch her, and she responded with genius." Director William Wellman was less poetic: "Movie stardom isn't acting ability—its personality and temperament ... I once directed Clara Bow (Wings). She was mad and crazy, but WHAT a personality!". And in 1981, Budd Schulberg described Bow as "an easy winner of the dumbbell award" who "couldn't act," and compared her to a puppy that his father B. P. Schulberg "trained to become Lassie."

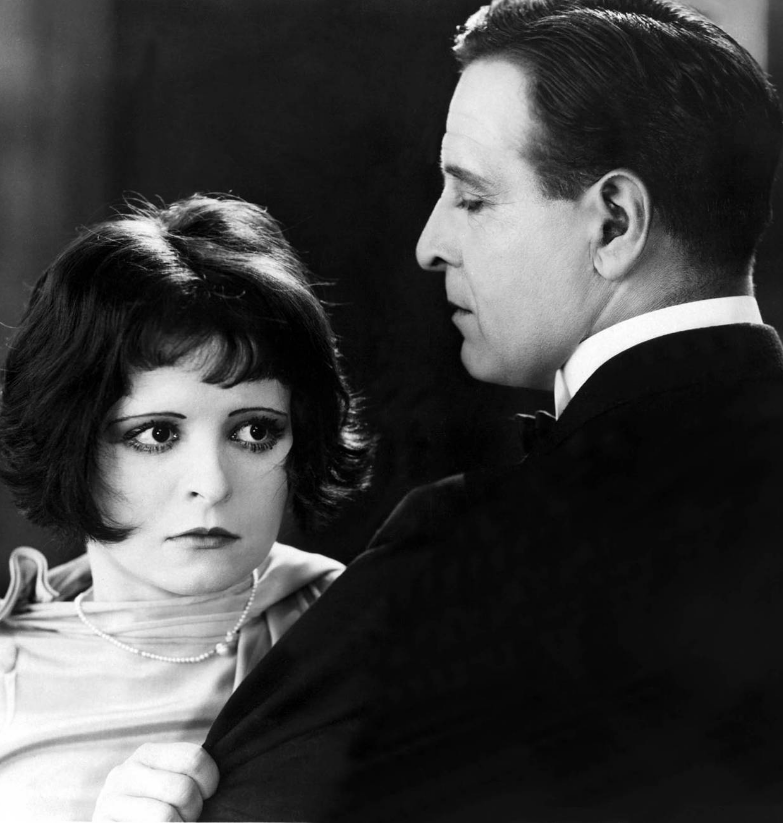
Bow as "Kittens" in Dancing Mothers (1926) is moments from realizing that her mother is her rival. Conway Tearle as "Jerry" is caught in between.

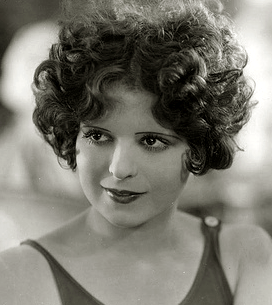
Bow as "Rosie O'Reilly" in Rough House Rosie, 1927

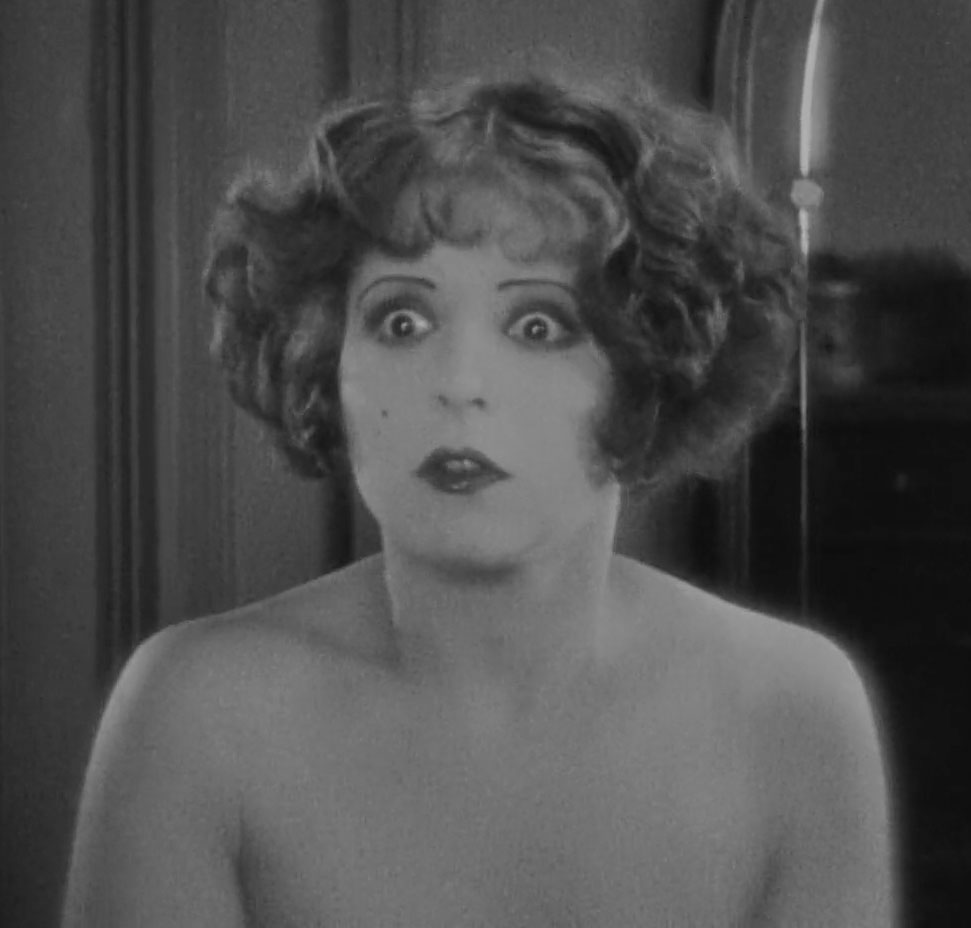
Bow as "Mary Preston" in Wings, 1927

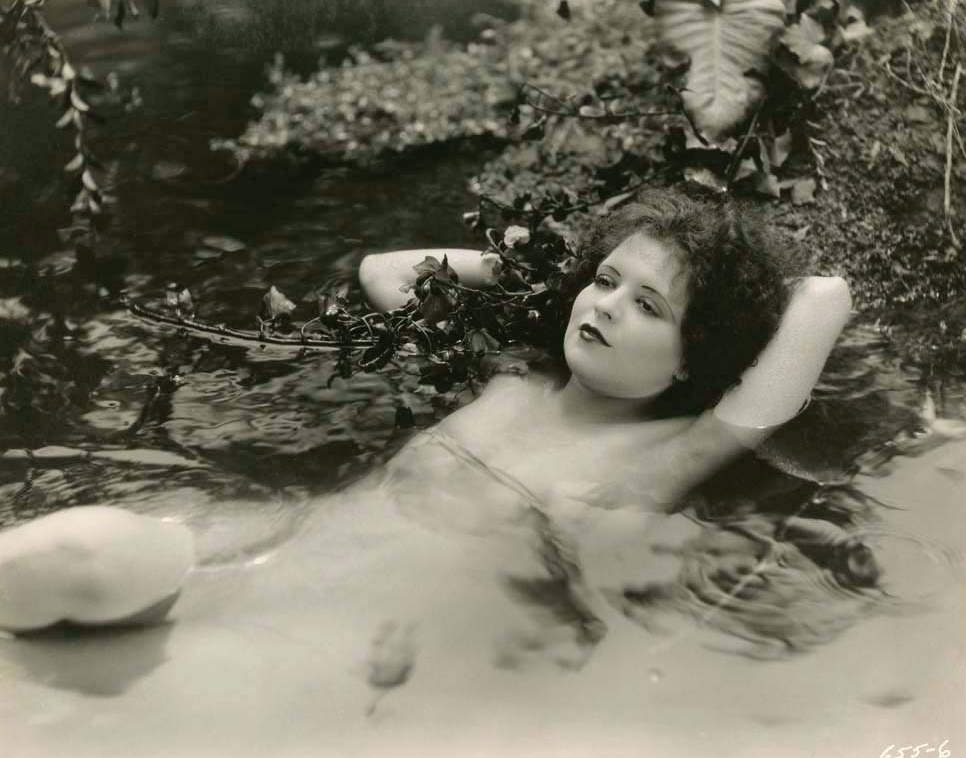
Bow as "Hula Calhoun" in Hula (1927)

=== 1929–1933: Sound films ===
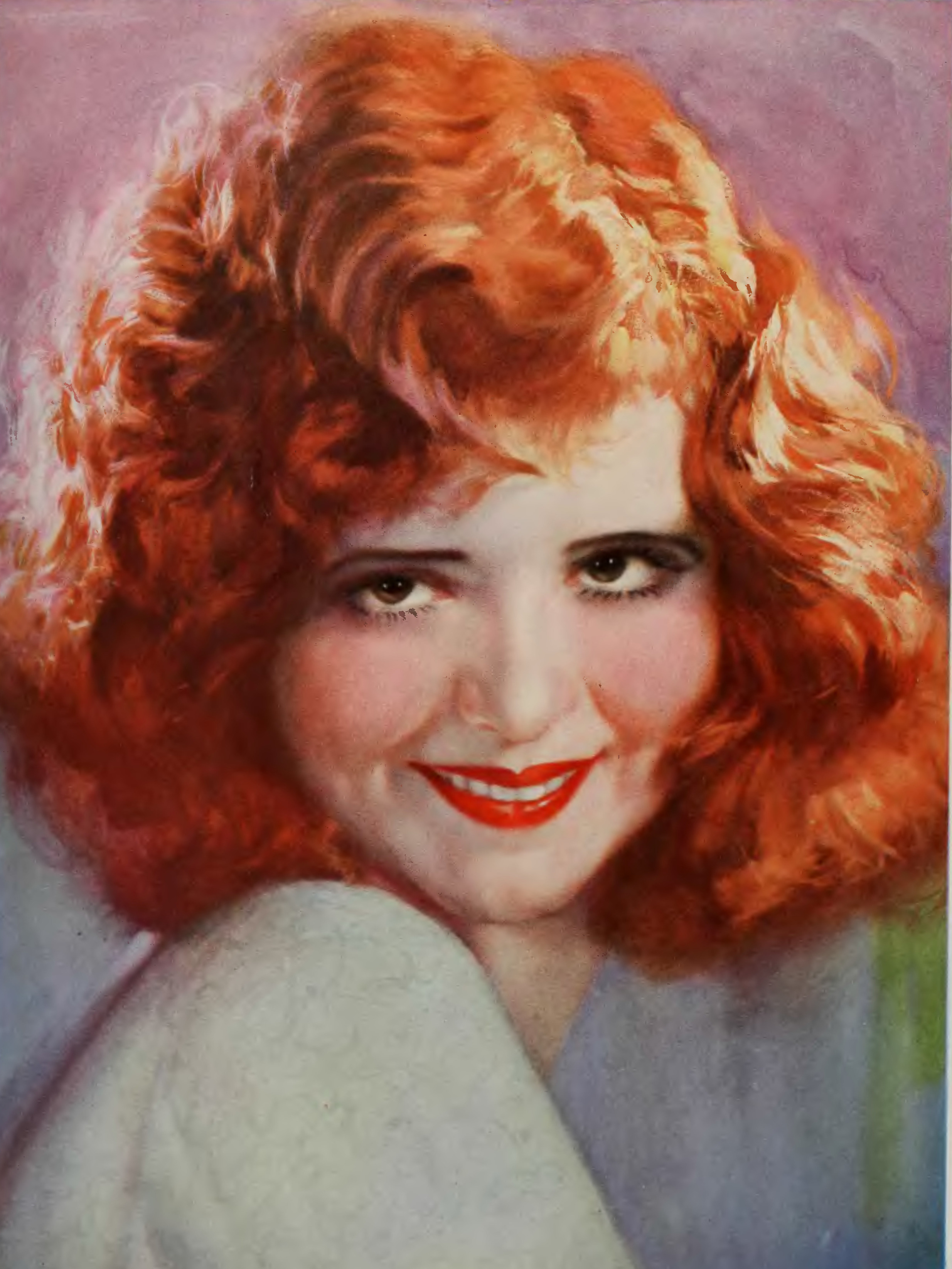
Bow in Call Her Savage, 1932

With "talkies" The Wild Party, Dangerous Curves, and The Saturday Night Kid, all released in 1929, Bow kept her position as the top box-office draw and queen of Hollywood. Neither the quality of Bow's voice nor her Brooklyn accent was an issue to Bow, her fans, or Paramount. However, Bow, like Charlie Chaplin, Louise Brooks, and most other silent film stars, did not embrace the novelty: "I hate talkies ... they're stiff and limiting. You lose a lot of your cuteness, because there's no chance for action, and action is the most important thing to me."

A visibly nervous Bow had to do a number of retakes in The Wild Party because her eyes kept wandering up to the microphone overhead. "I can't buck progress ... I have to do the best I can," she said. In October 1929 Bow described her nerves as "all shot", saying that she had reached "the breaking point", and Photoplay cited reports of "rows of bottles of sedatives" by her bed. "Now they're having me sing. I sort of half-sing, half-talk, with hips-and-eye stuff. You know what I mean—like Maurice Chevalier. I used to sing at home and people would say, 'Pipe down! You're terrible!' But the studio thinks my voice is great."

With Paramount on Parade, True to the Navy, Love Among the Millionaires, and Her Wedding Night, Bow was second at the box-office only to Joan Crawford in 1930. With No Limit and Kick In, Bow held the position as fifth at box-office in 1931, but the pressures of fame, public scandals, and overwork, took their toll on Bow's fragile emotional health.

A damaging court trial charged her secretary Daisy DeVoe with financial mismanagement, by Paramount-friendly officials: Los Angeles District Attorney Buron Fitts, Assistant District Attorney David Clark, and Los Angeles Superior Court Judge William C. Doran.

According to the 1930 census, Bow lived at 512 Bedford Drive, together with her secretary and hairdresser, Daisy DeBoe (later DeVoe), in a house valued $25,000 with neighbors titled "Horse-keeper", "Physician", "Builder". Bow stated she was 23 years old, i.e., born 1906, contradicting the censuses of 1910 and 1920.

As she slipped closer to a major breakdown her manager, B.P. Schulberg, began referring to her as "Crisis-a-day-Clara". In April, Bow was taken to a sanatorium and, at her request, Paramount released her from her final undertaking: City Streets (1931). At 25 her career was essentially over. B. P. Schulberg tried to replace Bow with his girlfriend Sylvia Sidney, but Paramount went into receivership, lost its position as the biggest studio (to MGM), and fired Schulberg. David Selznick explained:

...[when] Bow was at her height in pictures we could make a story with her in it and gross a million and a half, where another actress would gross half a million in the same picture and with the same cast.

— Selznick

A cattle brand from Clara Bow's & Rex Bell's Nevada ranch

Bow left Hollywood for Rex Bell's ranch in Nevada, her "desert paradise", in June and married him in then small-town Las Vegas in December. In an interview on December 17, Bow detailed her way back to health: sleep, exercise, and food, and the day after it she returned to Hollywood "for the sole purpose of making enough money to be able to stay out of it." Soon every studio in Hollywood (except Paramount) and even overseas wanted her services. Mary Pickford stated that Bow "was a very great actress" and wanted her to play her sister in Secrets (1933),

Howard Hughes offered her a three-picture deal, and MGM wanted her to star in Red-Headed Woman (1932). Bow agreed to the script, but eventually rejected the offer since Irving Thalberg required her to sign a long-term contract. On April 28, 1932, Bow signed a two-picture deal with Fox Film Corporation, for Call Her Savage (1932) and Hoop-La (1933). Both were successful. Variety favored Hoop-La. The October 1934, Family Circle Film Guide rated the film as "pretty good entertainment" and stated: "This is the most acceptable bit of talkie acting Miss Bow has done." However, they noted, "Miss Bow is presented in her dancing duds as often as possible, and her dancing duds wouldn't weigh two pounds soaking wet." Bow commented on her revealing costume in Hoop-La: "Rex accused me of enjoying showing myself off. Then I got a little sore. He knew darn well I was doing it because we could use a little money these days. Who can't?"

True to the Navy (1930)
Bow sings in Paramount on Parade (1930).

Bow reflected on her career:

My life in Hollywood contained plenty of uproar. I'm sorry for a lot of it but not awfully sorry. I never did anything to hurt anyone else. I made a place for myself on the screen and you can't do that by being Mrs. Alcott's idea of a Little Woman.

== Retirement and later years ==
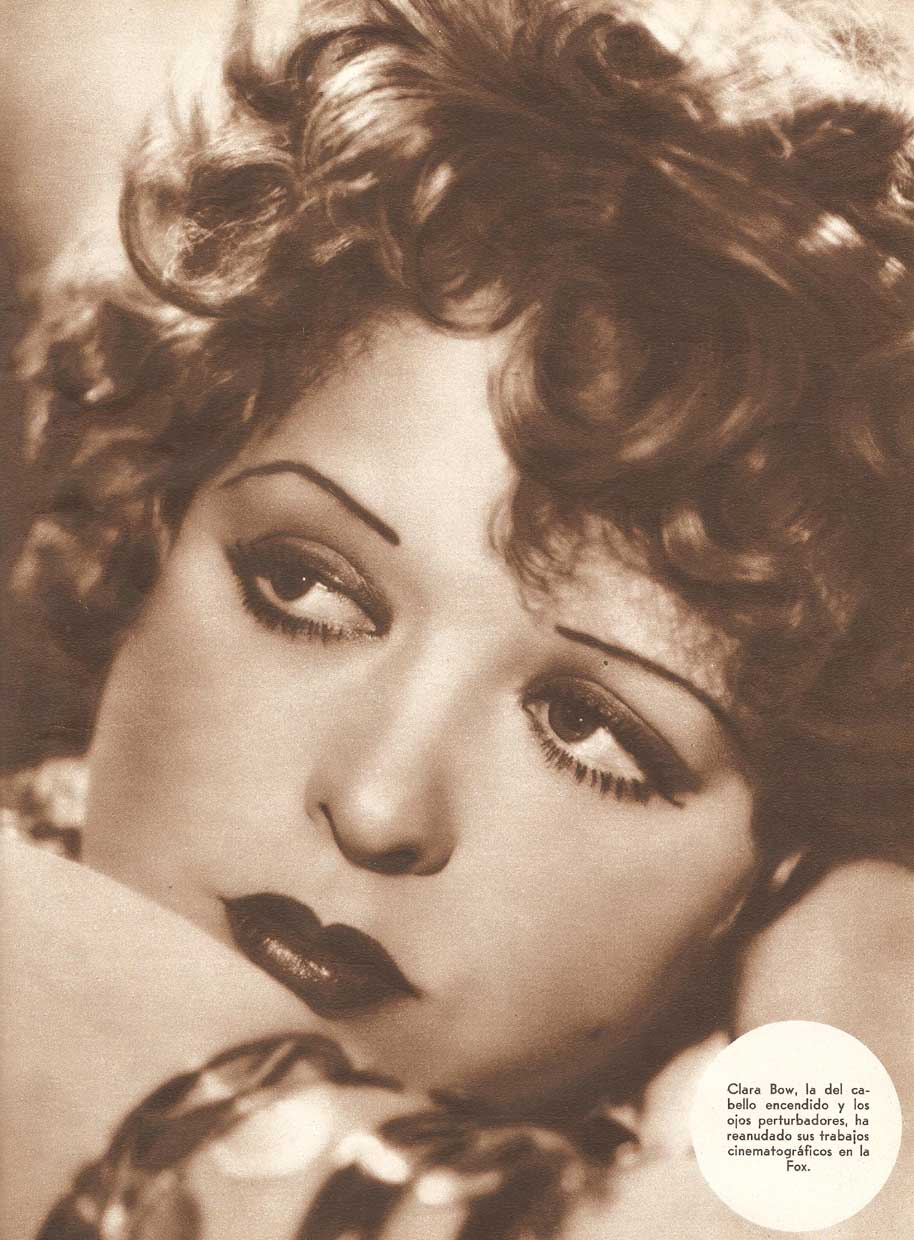
Argentinean magazine, 1934

Bow and actor Rex Bell (later a lieutenant governor of Nevada) had two sons, Tony Beldam (born 1934, changed name to Rex Anthony Bell Jr., died 2011) and George Beldam Jr. (born 1938, died in 2024). Bow retired from acting in 1933. In September 1937, Bow and Bell opened The 'It' Cafe in the Hollywood Plaza Hotel at 1637 N Vine Street, near Hollywood Boulevard in Los Angeles. They sold the cafe in 1943. Her last appearance, albeit via a taped recording, came in 1947 on the radio show Truth or Consequences, when Bow was the mystery voice in the show's "Mrs. Hush" contest.

=== Health issues ===
All the time the flapper is laughing and dancing, there's a feeling of tragedy underneath, she's unhappy and disillusioned, and that's what people sense.

— Clara Bow

Bow eventually began showing symptoms of psychiatric illness. She became socially withdrawn and, although she refused to socialize with her husband, she also refused to let him leave the house alone. In 1944, while Bell was running for the U.S. House of Representatives, Bow attempted suicide. A note was found in which Bow stated she preferred death to a public life.

In 1949, she checked into The Institute of Living to be treated for her chronic insomnia and diffuse abdominal pains. Shock treatment was tried and numerous psychological tests performed. Bow's IQ was measured "bright normal", while others claimed she was unable to reason, had poor judgment and displayed inappropriate or even bizarre behavior. Her pains were considered delusional and she was diagnosed with schizophrenia; however, she experienced neither auditory nor visual hallucinations. Analysts tied the onset of the illness, as well as her insomnia, to the "butcher knife episode" back in 1922, but Bow rejected psychological explanations and left the institute. She did not return to her family. After leaving the institution, Bow lived alone in a bungalow, which she rarely left, until her death.

== Death ==
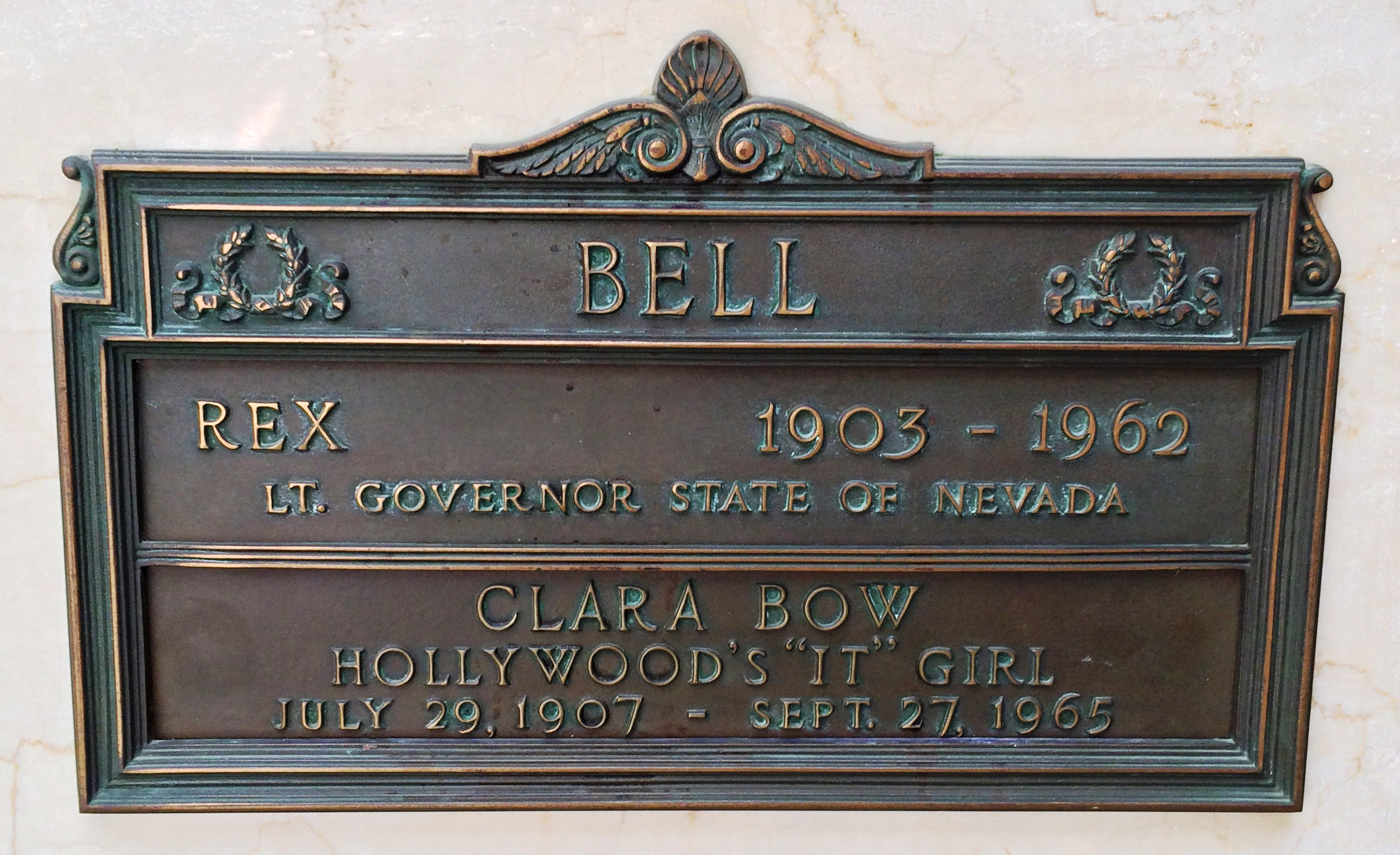
Bow's crypt at Forest Lawn Memorial Park, Glendale. The marker erroneously cites Bow's birth year as 1907, although she was born in 1905.

Bow spent her last years in Culver City, under the constant care of a nurse, Estalla Smith, living off an estate worth about $500,000 at the time of her death. In 1965, at age 60, she died of a heart attack, which her autopsy attributed to atherosclerosis. She was interred in the Freedom Mausoleum, Sanctuary of Heritage at Forest Lawn Memorial Park Cemetery in Glendale, California. Her pallbearers were Harry Richman, Richard Arlen, Jack Oakie, Maxie Rosenbloom, Jack Dempsey, and Buddy Rogers.

== Legacy ==
Film historian Leonard Maltin said in 1999: "You think of Greta Garbo, Lillian Gish, all these great names, great actresses. Clara Bow was more popular in terms of box-office dollars, in terms of consistently bringing audiences into the theaters. She was right on top." In 1999 the American Film Institute excluded Bow from its finalized "100 Years...100 Stars" list, although she was on the list of nominees.

Film historian Kevin Brownlow did not mention Bow in his 1968 book on silent films, The Parade's Gone By. Louise Brooks, who received an entire chapter in the book, wrote to Brownlow, "You brush off Clara Bow for some old nothing like Brooks. Clara made three pictures that will never be surpassed: Dancing Mothers, Mantrap, and It." In a conversation with filmmaker Thomas Hamilton, Brownlow explained that he had planned to include a chapter on Bow but was unable to secure an interview with the reclusive star before her death, and since all chapters were based on first-hand accounts, it would have been inconsistent to include a chapter based on second-hand anecdotes. Brownlow made up for this omission by including an entire segment about Bow in his television documentary Hollywood: A Celebration of the American Silent Film (1980), for which he interviewed Brooks.

== Awards and honors ==
- For her contributions to the film industry, Bow was awarded a motion pictures star on the Hollywood Walk of Fame in 1960. Her star is located at 1500 Vine Street.
- In 1994, she was honored with an image on a United States postage stamp designed by caricaturist Al Hirschfeld.

== In popular culture ==
- Max Fleischer's cartoon character Betty Boop was modelled after Bow's appearance and after the voice of entertainer Helen Kane (the "boop-boop-a-doop-girl").
- Bow's mass of tangled red hair was one of her most famous features. When fans of the new star found out she put henna in her hair, sales of the dye tripled.
- An autographed picture of Bow is offered as a consolation prize of a beauty contest in the 1931 George Gershwin musical Of Thee I Sing.
- During her lifetime, Bow was the subject of wild rumors regarding her sex life; many of them were untrue. A tabloid called The Coast Reporter published lurid allegations about her in 1931, accusing her of exhibitionism, incest, lesbianism, bestiality, drug addiction, alcoholism, and having contracted a venereal disease. The publisher of the tabloid then tried to blackmail Bow, offering to cease printing the stories for $25,000, which led to his arrest by federal agents and, later, an eight-year prison sentence.
- The lead character of Peppy Miller from the 2011 film The Artist was inspired principally by Clara Bow, and in playing the part, actress Bérénice Bejo invoked many of Bow's screen mannerisms.
- Bow inspired the name of the player character Laura Bow in the video games The Colonel's Bequest and The Dagger of Amon Ra.
- On July 5, 2016, Variety announced that Silver Bullet Entertainment and MJW Media were producing a film based on David Stenn's biography, Clara Bow: Runnin' Wild.
- Bow is mentioned in the Prince song "Condition of the Heart" from his 1985 album Around the World in a Day and drawn on the cover of the album.
- "Clara Bow" is also the title of a song on alternative rock-band 50 Foot Wave's debut album 50 Foot Wave.
- The song "Picture Show" in the Broadway musical Bonnie and Clyde mentions "Clara Bow", the "It Girl", to reference a movie star.
- The 16th track and closing song on Taylor Swift's 2024 studio album, The Tortured Poets Department, is titled "Clara Bow", and references the struggles of stardom encountered by Bow.

=== Fictional portrayals ===
- Bow was played by Jennifer Tilly in the motion picture Return to Babylon (2013).
- Margot Robbie plays a fictionalized character based on Bow in the 2022 film Babylon.

== Notes and references ==
=== Sources ===
- Basinger, Jeanine (1993). A woman's view: how Hollywood spoke to women, 1930-1960. New York: Knopf. ISBN 978-0-307-83154-5. OCLC 624411298 – via Internet Archive.
- Bow, Carla (1929). "By Carla Bow". In Herman, Hal C.; Hoins, Jack (eds.). How I Broke into the Movies: Signed Autobiographies by Sixty Famous Screen Stars. Hollywood: H.C. Herman. p. 9–. OCLC 946204260. Reprint: ISBN 978-1258116101.
- Berkin, Carol; Miller, Christopher L.; Cherny, Robert W.; Gormly, James L. (2003). Making America: A History of the United States. Vol. 2: From 1865. Boston, Mass.: Houghton Mifflin Co. ISBN 9780618190683. OCLC 52548553 – via Internet Archive.
- Brooks, Louise (1982). Lulu in Hollywood. New York: Knopf. ISBN 009949860X. OCLC 572137810 – via Internet Archive.
- Drowne, Kathleen Morgan; Huber, Patrick (2004). The 1920s. Westport, CT, US: Greenwood Press. ISBN 0-313-06222-6. OCLC 141200810 – via Internet Archive.
- Gammel, Irene (2012). "Lacing Up the Gloves". Cultural and Social History. 9 (3). Informa UK Limited: 369–390. doi:10.2752/147800412x13347542916620. ISSN 1478-0038. S2CID 146585456.
- Jacobson, Arthur; Atkins, Irene Kahn (1991). Arthur Jacobson: Interviewed by Irene Kahn Atkin. Directors Guild of America Oral History. Metuchen, New Jersey: Scarecrow Press and Directors Guild of America. ISBN 978-0-8108-2468-3. OCLC 925733552.
- Kaufman, George S.; Ryskind, Morrie; Gershwin, George; Gershwin, Ira (1963) [1931]. Of Thee I Sing: A Musical Play in Two Acts. New York: Samuel French. OCLC 1285748219 – via Internet Archive. Reprint: ISBN 9780573680373.
- Koszarski, Richard (2008). Hollywood on the Hudson: Film and Television in New York from Griffith to Sarnoff. New Brunswick, N.J.: Rutgers University Press. ISBN 978-0-8135-4552-3. OCLC 289908131 – via Internet Archive.
- Kyvig, David E. (2002). Daily life in the United States, 1920-1939: Decades of Promise and Pain. Westport, CN, US: Greenwood Press. ISBN 0-313-00692-X. OCLC 51551104 – via Internet Archive.
- Morella, Joseph; Epstein, Edward Z. (1976). The "It" Girl: The Incredible Story of Clara Bow. New York: Delacorte Press. ISBN 0-440-14068-4.
- Porter, Darwin (2005). Howard Hughes: Hell's Angel. New York: Blood Moon. ISBN 978-0-9786465-7-8. OCLC 659564795 – via Internet Archive.
- Sandburg, Carl (2000). Bernstein, Arnie (ed.). The Movies Are: Carl Sandburg's Film Reviews and Essays, 1920-1928. Chicago, IL, US: Lake Claremont Press. ISBN 1-893121-05-4. OCLC 1036786132 – via Internet Archive, access available to patrons with print disabilities.
- Sarvady, Andrea Cornell (2006). Miller, Frank (ed.). Leading Ladies: The 50 Most Unforgettable Actresses of the Studio Era. TCM film guide. San Francisco, California: Chronicle Books. ISBN 978-0-8118-5248-7. OCLC 64744501.
- Savage, Jon (2007). Teenage: The Creation of Youth Culture. New York: Viking. ISBN 978-0-670-03837-4. OCLC 646931427 – via Internet Archive.
- Schulberg, Budd (1981). Moving Pictures: Memories of a Hollywood Prince. New York City: Stein and Day. ISBN 9780812828177. OCLC 1088109855.
- Sherrow, Victoria (2006). Encyclopedia of Hair: A Cultural History. Westport, CT, US: Greenwood Press. ISBN 978-0313331459. OCLC 61169697 – via Internet Archive.
- Shippey, Lee (1929). "Clara Bow". Personal Glimpses of Famous Folks and Other Selections from the Lee Side o' L.A. Sierra Madre, CA, US: Sierra Madre Press. OCLC 1140786874 – via Internet Archive.
- St. Johns, Adela Rogers (December 1930). "The Salvation of Clara Bow". The New Movie Magazine. 2 (6): 38–40, 106. OCLC 31628059 – via Internet Archive.
- Stenn, David (2000). Clara Bow: Runnin' Wild. Cooper Square Press. ISBN 9781461660910.
- Zukor, Adolph; Kramer, Dale (1953). The Public is Never Wrong: The Autobiography of Adolph Zukor. New York: Putnam. hdl:2027/mdp.39015019349037. OCLC 573547672 – via HathiTrust.
