= EDHS =

EDHS may refer to:

- East Davidson High School, Thomasville, North Carolina, United States
- East Dubuque High School, East Dubuque, Illinois, United States
- El Dorado High School (disambiguation)

== See also ==
- Edh (disambiguation)
