= The Golden One =

Golden One or The Golden One may refer to:

- The Golden One, a 1961 novel by Henry Treece
- The Golden One (novel), a 2002 novel by Elizabeth Peters
- The Golden One, a 2020 comedy special by Whitmer Thomas
- Golden 1 Credit Union, an American credit union
  - Golden 1 Center, an arena in Sacramento, California
- El Dorado, a mythical tribal chief of the Muisca people
- Hathor, an ancient Egyptian goddess

== See also ==
- El Dorado (disambiguation)
