= Pretty Ugly (disambiguation) =

Pretty Ugly may refer to:

== Albums ==
- Pretty Ugly, 1997 studio album by Lunachicks
- Pretty Ugly (Scratcha DVA album), 2012 album by Scratcha DVA

== Songs ==
- "Pretty Ugly" (song), by Zara Larsson, 2025
- "Pretty Ugly", song from the 2005 album Normal (Ron "Bumblefoot" Thal album)
- "Pretty Ugly", song from the 2006 album Free Music! by 50 Foot Wave
- "Pretty/Ugly", song from the 2008 album What a Terrible Thing to Say by Four Letter Lie
- "Pretty Ugly", B-side track from the 2008 album Silver Spoons & Broken Bones by Stone Gods
- "Pretty Ugly", bonus track from the 2011 album Collider (Sam Roberts album)
- "Pretty Ugly", song from the 2011 album Parade (Parade album)
- "Pretty Ugly", song from the 2018 mixtape Whack World by Tierra Whack

== Literature ==
- Pretty Ugly, 2011 novel in The Bluford Series by Karyn Langhorne Folan
- Pretty Ugly, 2015 novel by Kirker Butler
- Pretty Ugly, 2019 book by Daphne Maurer
- Pretty Ugly, 2024 short fiction collection by Kirsty Gunn
- Pretty Ugly, 2024 children's book by David Sedaris

== Television ==
- "Pretty Ugly", episode 4 of The Real Housewives of Orange County season 9
- "Pretty Ugly / Glomer's Story", episode 3 of It's Punky Brewster
