= Lorado Mine =

Decommissioned mine in Saskatchewan, Canada

- Location in Saskatchewan
- Location: Saskatchewan, Canada; 59°29′N 108°39′W
- Products: Uranium
- Opened: 1954 (mine); 1957 (mill)
- Closed: 1960
- Company: Lorado Uranium Mines Limited (currently Encana Oil and Gas)
- Acquired: 1953

The Lorado Mine was a uranium mine in northern Saskatchewan, Canada, located around 8 kilometres (5.0 mi) south of the community of Uranium City in the Beaverlodge Uranium District.

== See also ==
- List of mines in Saskatchewan
- Gunnar Mine
- Eldorado, Saskatchewan
- Uranium ore deposits
