= Gunnar Mine =

Uranium mine in Saskatchewan, Canada

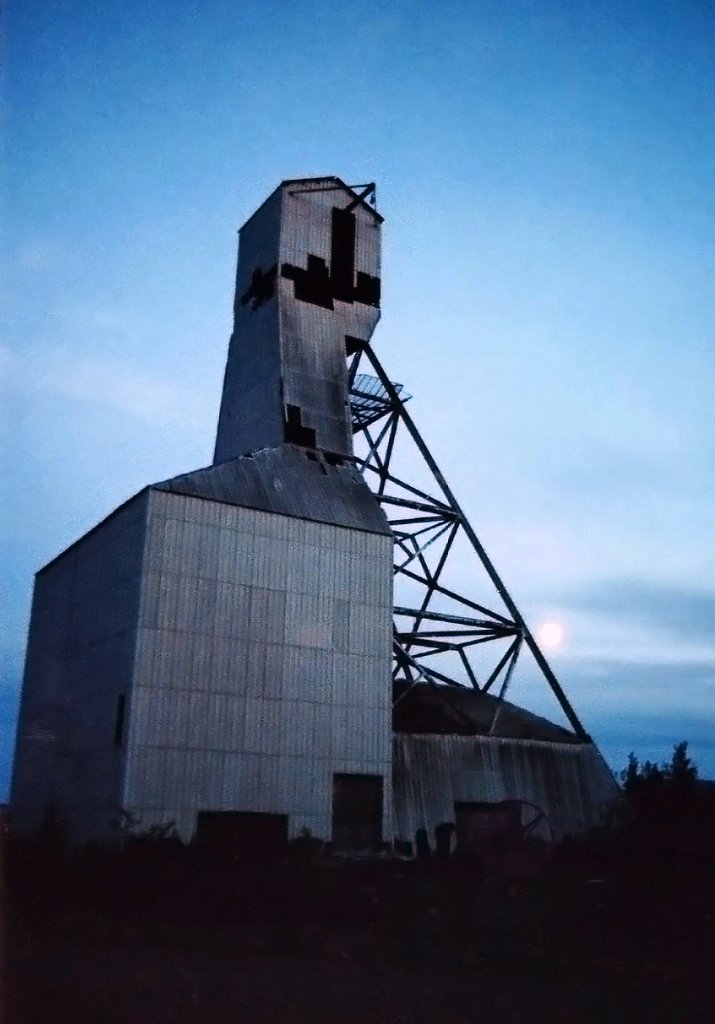
- The headframe at the Gunnar Mine

- Location in Saskatchewan
- Location: Athabasca Basin, Saskatchewan, Canada; 59°23′06″N 108°53′13″W
- Products: Uranium
- Discovered: 1952
- Opened: 1955
- Closed: 1963
- Company: Gunnar Mines

The Gunnar Mine was an active uranium mine in northern Saskatchewan, Canada, located approximately 25 kilometres (16 mi) southwest of the community of Uranium City and approximately 600 kilometres (370 mi) north of Saskatoon. This mine is situated on the Crackingstone Peninsula on the north shore of Lake Athabasca in the Beaverlodge Uranium District.

Over its lifetime, this mine produced 5,000,000 t (4,900,000 long tons; 5,500,000 short tons) of uranium ore and around 4,400,000 t (4,300,000 long tons; 4,900,000 short tons) of mining tailings.

In 2000, the Canadian Nuclear Safety Commission first visited the site to begin the remediation project of this abandoned mine.

== History ==
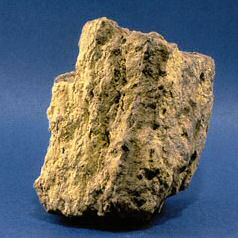
Uranium ore which the Gunnar Mine excavated for

The Gunnar deposit was discovered in July 1952, and the mine operated as both an open pit (1955–1961) and underground (1957–1963). The mine ceased production in 1963.

The Gunnar Mine headframe was demolished on August 4, 2011 but not decommissioned in any meaningful way. This led to a significant environmental remediation project funded by the Government of Canada. As of 2020, the mine was being decommissioned by the Saskatchewan Research Council who have a license to operate the site until 2024.

In 2019, the Canadian Nuclear Safety Commission inspection found overall good performance, but some errors with regards to controlling radioactive zones and labelling radioactive materials were found. These non-compliant acts were described as having "low safety significance," but issued enforcement notices

As of 2020, the mine was being decommissioned by the Saskatchewan Research Council who have a license to operate the site until 2024.

== Construction ==
This uranium deposit was discovered in 1952 and shortly after, in 1954 construction of a town, mill, and uranium mine began. Construction in such a remote location proved to be difficult for this mining town. In 1954, aircraft landed on frozen lakes nearby to survey the area and soon after a landing strip was dedicated to this mining site. Freight by air is significantly more expensive than by water. This meant that the mine had to accumulate a years worth of ore before the boat and barge season could begin due to ice and winter freeze. Due to this, Gunnar developed their own dedicated shallow draft tugboat to ship goods along a 440 km (270 mi) route in Alberta. This however, was only practical for about 15 weeks per year due to the winter freeze. The Gunnar Mine found that their operational cost were more than double than of similar mines in the south.

== Geology ==
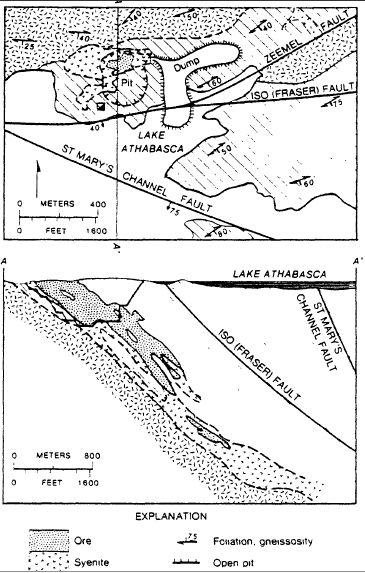
Gunnar Mine geological map and cross section

The Gunnar uranium deposit is located in the Athabasca Basin. This basin is a large geological structure characterized by its oval shape. This basin sits atop deformed and metamorphosed Archean rock. Uranium deposits can be found near on this basin and are formed through several stages of concentration through the movement of groundwater. The Gunnar uranium deposit occurred in Precambrian altered granitic gneiss. Pitchblende or uraninite was mined to a depth of 425 m (1,394 ft) between 1955 and 1963.

== Environmental remediation ==
After its closure in the 1960's, Gunnar Mine was abandoned with little work done to remediate the site from environmental harm. Both the Government of Canada and Government of Saskatchewan funded clean up and remediation projects which were expected to take 8 years total. This remediation project was followed by 10 to 15 years of monitoring. The provincial and federal government regulate the Gunnar Mine because of the large quantities of tailings and waste rock generated by this mine. These government parties created detailed environmental impact assessments in efforts to plan for remediation. Currently, the remediation options for the Gunnar Mine include deep lake disposal of tailings, open pit disposal of tailings which would then be filled with water, or covering the open pit filled with tailings then covering it to seal it off from the environment. In addition to the mining waste products, this mine also includes buildings and facilities for the 800 people who worked there. These buildings contain asbestos which will also need to be disposed of in a proper manner. In 2010, many of the buildings and facilities remained intact and in October of 2011 the demolition order was completed.

== See also ==
- List of mines in Saskatchewan
- Eldorado, Saskatchewan
- Lorado Mine
- Uranium ore deposits
