= Helldorado =

Helldorado may refer to:

- Helldorado, a nickname for Tombstone, Arizona (a variation of El Dorado) created by a disgruntled miner who wrote a letter in July 1881 to the Tombstone Nugget newspaper complaining about trying to find his fortune and ending up washing dishes
- Helldorado (album), the eighth album by W.A.S.P., released in 1999
- Helldorado (band), a Norwegian Americana band
- Helldorado Days (Las Vegas), a rodeo, parade and festival in Las Vegas, Nevada (first held 1935)
- Helldorado Days (Tombstone), an annual celebration and parade in Tombstone, Arizona (first held 1929)
- Helldorado (video game), a 2007 strategy video game
- Helldorado (film), a 1934 American film, starring Ralph Bellamy
- Heldorado, a 1946 Roy Rogers film set in the Las Vegas Helldorado Days celebrations

== See also ==
- El Dorado (disambiguation)
