= Eldorado, Saskatchewan =

Ghost town in Saskatchewan, Canada

Eldorado
- Ghost town
- Location of Eldorado
- Coordinates: 59°33′00″N 108°30′07″W
- Country: Canada
- Province: Saskatchewan
- Region: Northern Saskatchewan
- Census division: Division No. 18
- Post office opened: July 9, 1953
- Post office closed: July 20, 1982
- Time zone: CST
- Postal code: S0H 2P0 & S0J 0T0
- Area code: 306

Eldorado is a former mining community turned ghost town located on Beaverlodge Lake in northern Saskatchewan, Canada. Its original name was Beaverlodge. Eldorado and nearby Uranium City are along Highway 962, an isolated stretch of highway.

== History ==
Population history of Eldorado
Year	Pop.	±%
1951	184	—
1956	939	+410.3%
1961	526	−44.0%
1966	470	−10.6%
1971	289	−38.5%
1976	37	−87.2%
1981	229	+518.9%
Source: Statistics Canada

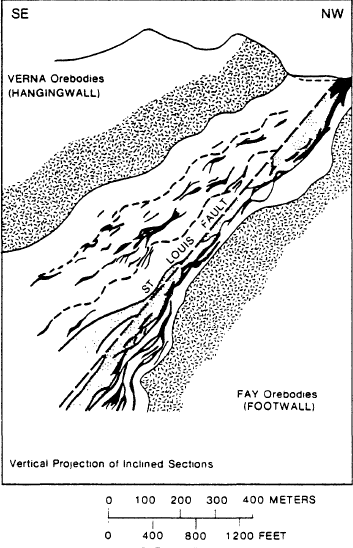
Fay-Ace-Verna Mines geologic cross section. The shaded area depicts Tazin granites and gneisses, while the black areas are ore bodies.

After uranium was discovered in the Beaverlodge District in 1946, Eldorado Mining and Refining established Eldorado as a community to house its miners, their families, and related workers. By 1951, the community of Eldorado had a population of 184.

Eldorado Mining and Refining opened the Beaverlodge Mine in 1953. The Eldorado Company's major production came from the Fay-Ace-Verna mine shafts, mostly from uranium deposits located in the Archaen Tazin Group. The deposits are found within the footwall and hanging wall of the St. Louis fault.

Eldorado had a one-room school that taught students through to grade six, after which they were transported to Uranium City. The first post office was established in 1953 with John Edgar Hamlin as postmaster. The community grew to a population of 939 by 1956.

After the decline of Eldorado's population to 229 in 1981, the Beaverlodge Mine shut down in 1982. The post office closed July 20, 1982, with May A. Grona as the last postmaster.

== Climate ==
Climate data for Eldorado
Month	Jan	Feb	Mar	Apr	May	Jun	Jul	Aug	Sep	Oct	Nov	Dec	Year
Mean daily maximum °C (°F)	−21 (−5)	−16 (3)	−8 (17)	3 (37)	12 (53)	18 (64)	21 (69)	19 (66)	11 (51)	3 (37)	−7 (19)	−17 (1)	2 (34)
Daily mean °C (°F)	−26 (−14)	−22 (−7)	−14 (6)	−3 (26)	6 (42)	13 (55)	16 (60)	14 (57)	7 (44)	0 (32)	−11 (12)	−22 (−7)	−3 (26)
Mean daily minimum °C (°F)	−31 (−23)	−28 (−18)	−21 (−5)	−9 (15)	0 (32)	7 (44)	10 (50)	9 (48)	3 (37)	−2 (28)	−15 (5)	−26 (−14)	−9 (17)
Source: weatherbase

== Transportation ==
Eldorado had its own air service of DC-3s and DC-4s, which supplemented commercial air service by Pacific Western Airlines. Air was the accepted mode of travel to and from Eldorado and Uranium City.

== See also ==
- Eldorado Mine (Saskatchewan)
- Gunnar Mine
- Lorado Mine
