= Betty (band) =

American alternative rock group

BETTY
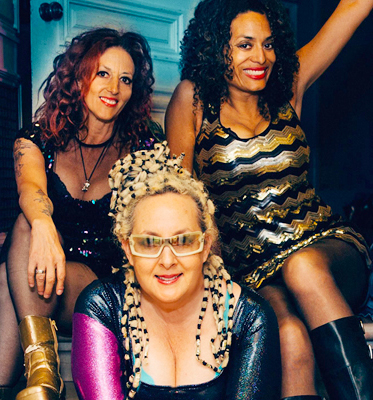

Background information
- Origin: Washington, D.C.
- Genres: Alternative rock, pop
- Years active: 1986–present
- Members: Alyson Palmer; Elizabeth Ziff; Amy Ziff
- Website: hellobetty.com

Betty (stylized as BETTY) is an alternative pop / rock band from New York City.

== Biography ==
BETTY was formed in 1986 in Washington D.C. around the scene of the 9:30 Club.

The band is composed of Elizabeth Ziff (vocals, guitar and electronic accompaniment), Alyson Palmer (vocals and bass) and Amy Ziff (vocals and cello).

In 1989, the band relocated to New York City. The name of their first album, Hello, BETTY! comes from the standard opening for all their appearances.

BETTY appeared in every episode of the 1989 HBO series Encyclopedia, singing educational songs each centered on a particular word, as well as performing the opening and closing theme songs.

In 2002, the group starred in its own off-Broadway show BETTY Rules directed by Rent's Michael Greif. The musical ran for nine months at the Zipper Theatre. The show has since been performed in Chicago at the Lakeside Theatre and sold out three runs at Theater J in Washington, D.C.

From 2005 to 2009, BETTY appeared as a regular guest artist on the television show The L Word, for which they provided the theme song.

Activist entertainers, BETTY is as well known for their performances at rallies for causes in which they believe.

BETTY has documented their formation and rise in the Washington D.C. and New York City music scenes in their podcast, "BETTY: Girlband" available on Apple Podcasts.

== Lineup ==
- Elizabeth Ziff (vocals, guitar)
- Alyson Palmer (vocals, bass)
- Amy Ziff (vocals, cello)

== Discography ==
- 1992: Hello, BETTY!
- 1994: Kiss My Sticky (EP)
- 1996: Limboland
- 1999: betty3
- 2000: Carnival
- 2002: BETTY Rules
- 2004: Snowbiz (Holiday)
- 2009: Bright & Dark
- 2013: Rise (EP)
- 2016: On The Rocks
- 2024: EAT

== Television series ==
- Encyclopedia—HBO (house band) (1986)
- Real Sex—HBO (theme song)
- The L Word—Showtime (theme song and regular appearances)
- Weeds—Showtime (end credits song, season 6, episode 8)
- Cover Shot—TLC (theme song)
- Out on the Edge—Comedy Central (house band and theme song)
- Ms. Adventure—Animal Planet (theme song)
- Fashionably Late—TLC (theme song)
- Remote Control—MTV (guest appearance)
- USA Up All Night—USA (guest host)
- Love Bites—NBC (2011)

== Filmography ==
- 1993: Life with Mikey
- 1994: It's Pat
- 1995: The Incredibly True Adventures of Two Girls in Love
- 1997: First We Take Manhattan
- 1999: The Out-of-Towners

== Additional performances/recordings ==
- Rock for Choice
- June 10, 1992: Sondheim: A Celebration at Carnegie Hall
