= Eldorado, Zimbabwe =

Human settlement in Zimbabwe

Coordinates: 17°21′S 30°14′E

Eldorado, Zimbabwe is a settlement around a gold mine near Chinhoyi in Mashonaland West province in Zimbabwe.
