= El Dorado Canyon =

El Dorado Canyon or Eldorado Canyon may refer to:

- El Dorado Canyon (Nevada)
- Eldorado Canyon State Park, Colorado
- Operation El Dorado Canyon, the codename of the 1986 United States bombing of Libya
