= Eldorado, South Africa =

Eldorado
- Location within Limpopo Location within South Africa
- Coordinates: 22.898°S 28.814°E
- Country: South Africa
- Province: Limpopo
- District: Capricorn
- Municipality: Blouberg

Area
  - Total: 3.09 km^{2} (1.19 sq mi)

Population (2011)
  - Total: 2,246
  - Density: 727/km^{2} (1,880/sq mi)

Racial makeup (2011)
  - Black African: 99.9%
  - Other: 0.1%

First languages (2011)
  - Northern Sotho: 98.5%
  - Other: 1.5%
- Time zone: UTC+2 (SAST)
- PO box: 0718

Eldorado is a town in Capricorn District Municipality in the Limpopo province of South Africa.
