= EDH =

Edh or EDH may refer to:

- Edh (Ð ð), a letter
- Edh, another letter
- El Dorado Hills, California, United States
- Elder Dragon Highlander, a variant format for the card game Magic: The Gathering
- Électricité d'Haïti, the largely government-owned electricity sector in Haiti
- Enterprise data hub, a data hub model for big data management based on the Hadoop platform as a central data repository
- Ephemeral Diffie–Hellman, a method in public-key cryptography
- Eric David Harris (1981-1999), American mass murderer
- Error Detection and Handling, a digital television protocol
- Extradural haematoma
