= Free Music! =

Studio album by 50 Foot Wave
- Released: April 4, 2006
- Genre: Alternative Rock
- Length: 16:08
- Label: Throwing Music/Reincarnate Records
- Producer: Mudrock

50 Foot Wave chronology
Golden Ocean (2005)	Free Music! (2006)	Power + Light (2009)

Free Music! is the second EP recording by rock band 50 Foot Wave, released in 2006.

Professional ratings
Review scores
Source	Rating
Allmusic	3/5 stars

== Track listing ==
all songs by Rob Ahlers, Bernard Georges and Kristin Hersh

1. "Hot Pink, Distorted" - 3:36
2. "Vena Cava" - 3:59
3. "Pretty Ugly" - 2:57
4. "Animal" - 3:08
5. "The Fuchsia Wall" - 2:33

== Personnel ==
- Kristin Hersh - vocals, guitars
- Bernard Georges - bass
- Rob Ahlers - drums, vocals

== Production ==
- Producer: Mudrock
- Recorded and Mixed: Mudrock and ai fujisaki
- Mastering: Joe Gastwirt at Gastwirt Mastering
- Design: Lakuna, Inc.
