= Eldorado Mine (Saskatchewan) =

Uranium mine in Saskatchewan, Canada

- Location within Saskatchewan
- Location: Athabasca Basin, Saskatchewan, Canada; 59.55°N 108.48°W
- Products: Uranium
- Opened: 1953
- Closed: 1982
- Company: Cameco
- Website: http://www.beaverlodgesites.com/

The Beaverlodge Mine sometimes referred to as the Eldorado Mine or the Beaverlodge Operation was a uranium mine in the community of Eldorado, northern Saskatchewan, Canada. Eldorado was a small community 7 kilometres (4.3 mi) east of the community of Uranium City, Saskatchewan in the Beaverlodge Uranium District built by Eldorado Mining and Refining Limited to house the workforce and families of the mine.

The mine was opened in 1952, and was owned and operated by Eldorado Mining and Refining, a Crown Corporation of the Canadian government.

The site has 70 properties, an underground mine, several smaller satellite mines, a central mill, open pit mines and a tailings area

The mine was closed in June 1982 and decommissioning started in 1985. It was the first mine to present a formal decommissioning plan to under an Atomic Energy Control Board license.

In 2009 five of the 70 properties were released from Canadian Nuclear Safety Commission licensing and under the supervision of the Institutional Control Program. Another 20 properties were released to the Institutional Control Program on 19 December 2019 and one property was completely released from licensing.

On 27 May 2013 the Canadian Nuclear Safety Commission provided a ten-year license for the site, obliging Cameco to implement increased remediation.

The site is managed by Cameco.

As a result of contamination, the Canadian Nuclear Safety Commission advises against consuming fish from the creek and lake near the site.

In 2019 the Athabasca Chipewyan First Nation raised the issue of radiation contamination as a result of the historical movement of uranium through Fort Chipewyan. Research by Cameco did not find evidence that this route was used. The Canadian Nuclear Safety Commission emailed the Athabasca Chipewyan First Nation in July and August 2020.

== See also ==
- Uranium ore deposits
