= El Dorado High School =

El Dorado High School may refer to one of several high schools in the United States:

- El Dorado High School (Arizona) — Chandler, Arizona
- El Dorado High School (Arkansas) — El Dorado, Arkansas
- Eldorado Emerson Private School – Orange, California
- El Dorado High School (Placentia, California) — Placentia, California
- El Dorado High School (Placerville, California) — Placerville, California
- El Dorado High School (Kansas) — El Dorado, Kansas
- El Dorado High School (New Mexico) — Albuquerque, New Mexico
- El Dorado High School (El Paso, Texas) — El Paso, Texas
- El Dorado Springs High School — El Dorado Springs, Missouri
