= 50 Foot Wave =

American alternative rock band

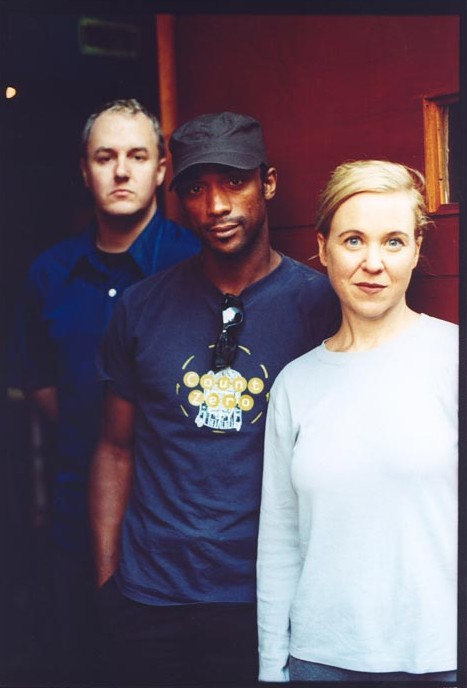
- 50FOOTWAVE: Ahlers, Georges, Hersh (Photo: Steve Gullick)

Background information
- Also known as: L'~
- Origin: United States
- Genres: Alternative rock
- Years active: 2003–present
- Members: Kristin Hersh; Bernard Georges; Rob Ahlers
- Website: https://www.firerecords.com/artists/50-foot-wave/

50 Foot Wave (often stylized as 50FOOTWAVE) is an American alternative rock band, formed in 2003. The band is fronted by Kristin Hersh, who writes the group's songs with collaborative efforts from the other group members in composing and arranging the music. The group's name is a reference to both an illustration and the term for the 50-foot sound wave of the lowest F tone audible to the human ear. The band sometimes abbreviates its name as L'~, using the Roman numeral for 50.

== History ==
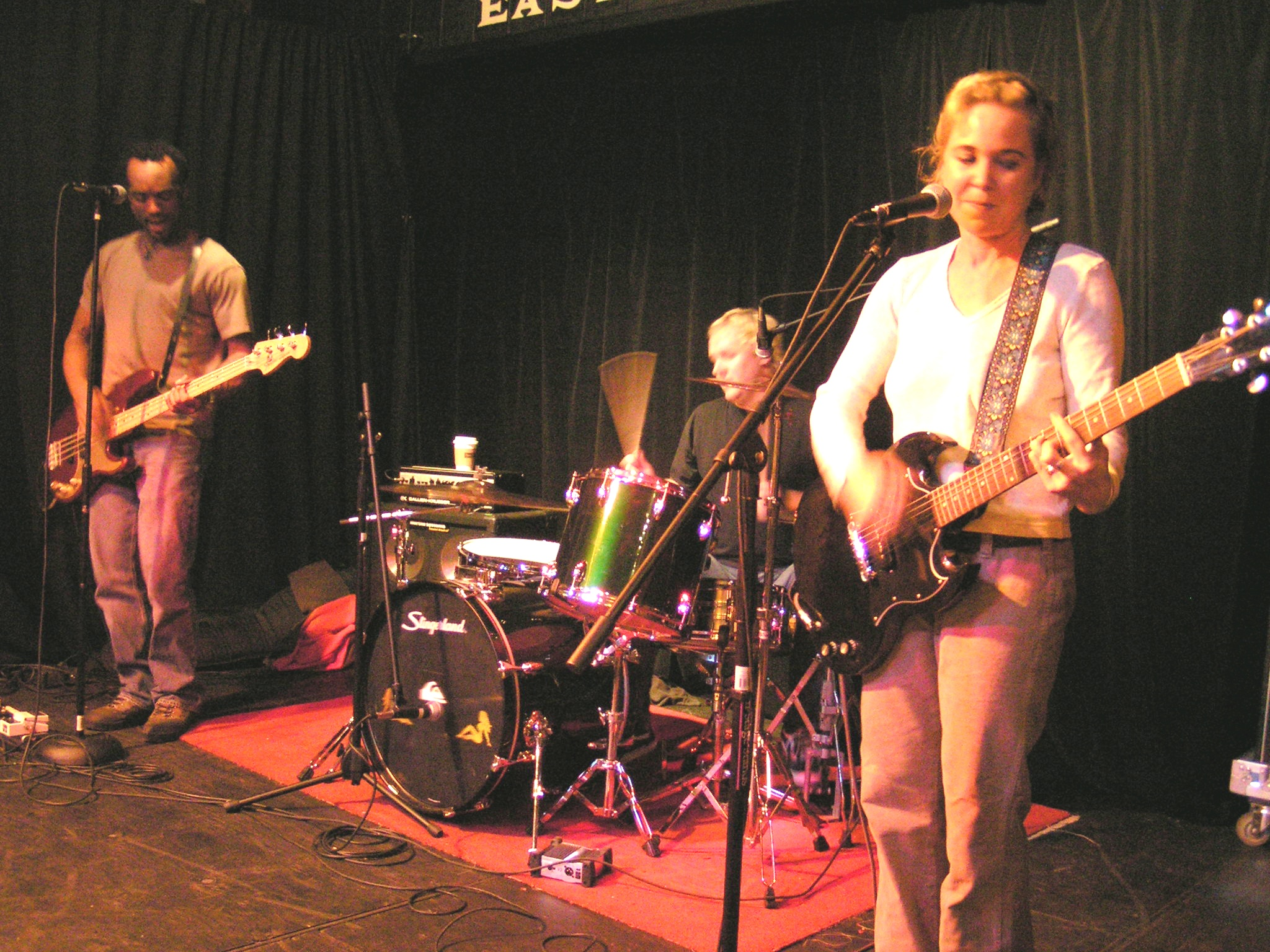
Live in Seattle, 2004 Photo: Mike Baehr

Kristin Hersh previously spent more than two decades playing with Throwing Muses, releasing several solo albums as well. Her solo tours in the late 1990s and early 2000s focused on acoustic guitar playing. In 2003, she launched the more electric guitar-oriented 50FOOTWAVE.

The band was designed as a power trio, with a lineup including drummer Rob Ahlers and Throwing Muses bassist Bernard Georges. Hersh contributes guitar, lyrics, and vocals to this project. The band's first live performance was recorded in Burbank in October 2003 and released on a very limited basis as an official bootleg. Among other live appearances internationally in 2004, 50 Foot Wave performed a month-long residency of shows in January that year at the Silverlake Lounge, while the group was based in the Los Angeles area. The group's self-titled studio mini-album was co-released in March 2004 by the band's ThrowingMusic label and 4AD Records.

Hersh has described 50FOOTWAVE's music as "having a lot of math in it," while also calling it less emotionally and musically "tangled" than some of her past Throwing Muses work. Others have described some of the new songs as having "confrontational" lyrics.

In March 2005, the group released its long-planned, full-length album, Golden Ocean, on ThrowingMusic, in partnership with 4AD.

The group toured Europe and the United States in 2005, while Hersh simultaneously continued her solo concerts in alternating parts of the year.

In December 2005, the band released a new EP called Free Music! available via free FLAC and mp3 downloads at their website and several download partner sites. The downloads reserved some rights though Creative Commons licenses.

In early March 2009, the band released all their previous albums along with a selection of live tracks, an Instrumental EP and the upcoming Power+Light album for download at their website. As before, the tracks were available in FLAC and mp3 format and the band reserved some rights though Creative Commons licenses.

In early 2010, the band announced that its new EP would be titled "With Love from the Men's Room". The 5-track disc was recorded in Highland Park, CA, and it was released in January, 2012. Once again, the band released the music with Creative Commons licensing, and the liner notes encourage fans to "SHARE THIS MUSIC -- You are encouraged to repost, podcast, make videos, record covers, burn copies for friends, burn copies for enemies, USE it. Anything, everything is ok with us. What matters most to us is that people hear, connect with, and pass on this band's music".

== Personnel ==
- Kristin Hersh – vocals, guitar
- Bernard Georges – bass
- Rob Ahlers – drums

== Discography ==
- 50FOOTWAVE (2004, ThrowingMusic/4AD)
- Golden Ocean (2005, ThrowingMusic/4AD)
- Free Music! (2005, ThrowingMusic)
- Power + Light (2009, ThrowingMusic)
- With Love From The Men's Room (2012, ThrowingMusic)
- Bath White (2016, ThrowingMusic)
- Black Pearl (2022, Fire Records)

== Song samples ==
- "Sally Is a Girl," from Golden Ocean album(mp3 link via permission from toolshed.biz)
- "Bone China," from Golden Ocean album(mp3 link via permission from toolshed.biz)
- ThrowingMusic label videos and MP3s
- "Power + Light"
- Yahoo Music Videos(three band videos)
