= 50 Foot Wave (EP) =

EP by 50 Foot Wave
- Released: March 23, 2004
- Genre: Alternative rock
- Length: 19:40
- Label: 4AD/Throwing Music
- Producer: Ethan Allen

50 Foot Wave chronology
| 50 Foot Wave (2004) | Golden Ocean (2005) |

Professional ratings
Review scores
| Source | Rating |
|---|---|
| Allmusic | 3.5/5 stars |
| Pitchfork Media | (7.6/10) |
| Blender Magazine | 3/5 stars |

50 Foot Wave is an extended-play recording by American alternative-rock band 50 Foot Wave, released on March 23, 2004.

== Track listing ==
All tracks are written by Rob Ahlers, Bernard Georges, and Kristin Hersh.

| No. | Title | Length |
|---|---|---|
| 1. | "Bug" | 4:20 |
| 2. | "Clara Bow" | 3:10 |
| 3. | "Long Painting" | 2:57 |
| 4. | "Glory Weed" | 2:33 |
| 5. | "Lavender" | 2:50 |
| 6. | "Dog Days" | 3:52 |

== Personnel ==
- Kristin Hersh – vocals, guitars
- Bernard Georges – bass
- Rob Ahlers – drums, vocals

== Production ==
- Producer: Ethan Allen
- Recorded by Ethan Allen and James Adam Watts
- Mixing: Ethan Allen
- Mastering: Joe Gastwirt at Joe's Mastering Joint
- Design: Lakuna, Inc.
