= El Dorado Gold Mine =

Gold mine in Alaska, United States

Coordinates: 64°58′21″N 147°38′09″W

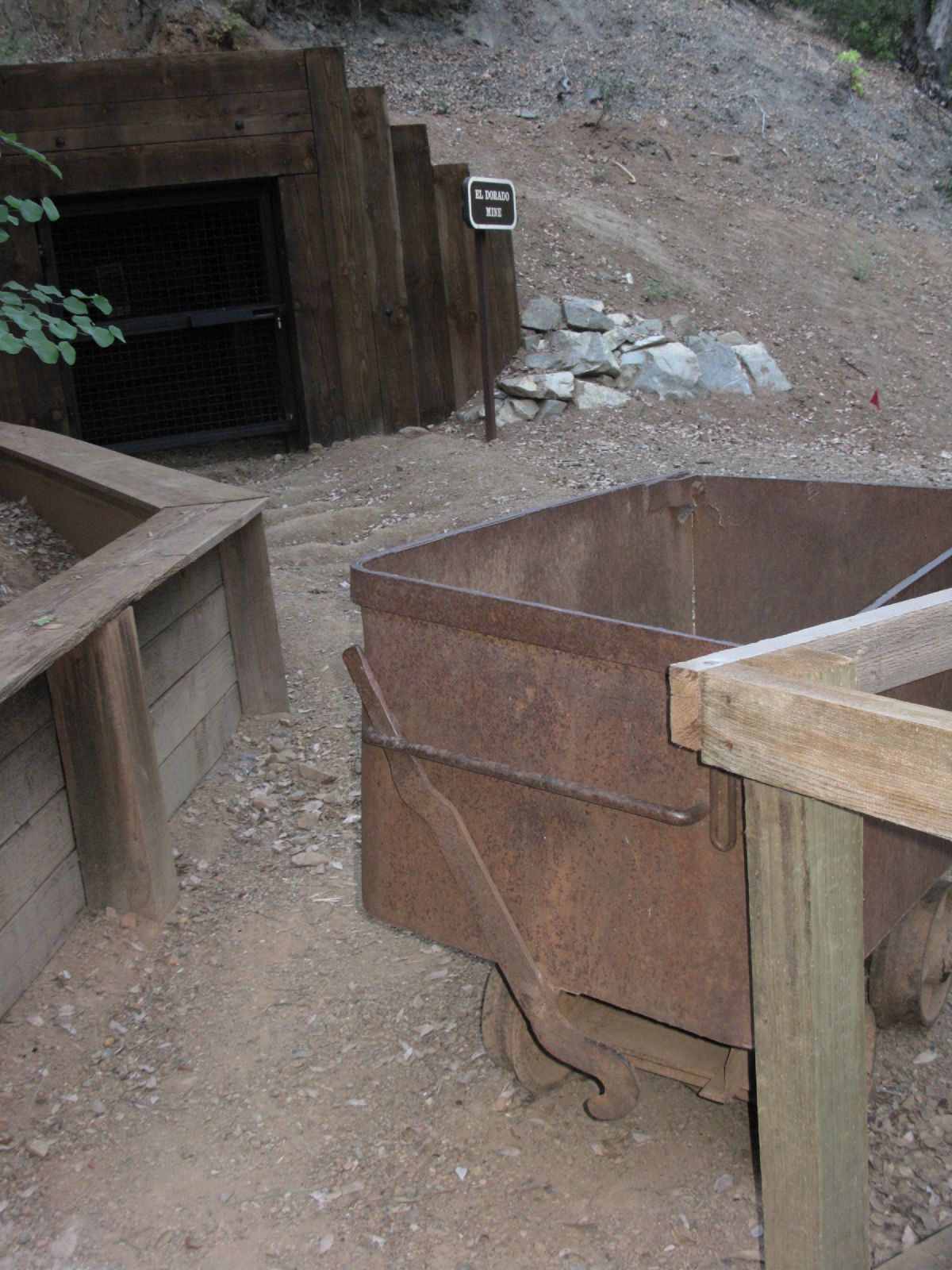
El Dorado Gold Mine

The El Dorado Gold Mine is a gold mine and tourist attraction at the unincorporated community of Fox, near Fairbanks, Alaska. Founded in the early 1900s, the El Dorado mine underwent a gradual transformation in the latter half of the 20th century into an informational mine and tour destination. The El Dorado Gold Mine is owned by Alaska Riverways, Inc., and is located 10 miles north of Fairbanks on the Elliot Highway.

== History ==
The El Dorado Gold Mine began as a placer mining claim operated by the "Swede Brothers" of Fairbanks in the early 1900s. As records of the era were spotty and often poorly kept, the mine's exact ownership history for much of the first half of the century is unclear, though it is known that the mine changed hands several times.

The mid-20th century was a turbulent period for the El Dorado mine, as gold mining was halted by order of President Franklin D. Roosevelt during World War II, and individual mining claims were hamstrung by the government's imposition of a fixed price for gold. Small claims became less and less profitable to mine, and operations at the El Dorado mine ground virtually to a halt.

The mine was eventually purchased by Andrew Wescott, a Fairbanks gold miner, in the late 20th century. Wescott, realizing that the profitable days of solo mining in interior Alaska had passed, began to rebuild the El Dorado mine as an informational tour destination for Alaska visitors. The mine eventually became such a popular stop for tourists that Wescott could not handle the increased business by himself, so in 1990 Wescott entered a partnership with the Binkley family of Fairbanks in order to better develop the mine. A few years later, Wescott sold his stake in the mine to the Binkleys.

The mine operates from May to September, offering tours of the mines and train tours several times per day.
