= Golden Ocean =

Studio album by 50 Foot Wave
- Released: March 8, 2005
- Recorded: June – August 2004
- Genre: Alternative rock
- Length: 37:31
- Label: Throwing Music
- Producer: Ethan Allen

50 Foot Wave chronology
50 Foot Wave (2004)	Golden Ocean (2005)	Free Music! (2006)

Professional ratings
Review scores
Source	Rating
Allmusic	4/5 stars
Entertainment Weekly	(B−)
Blender	link
PopMatters	9/10 stars
Maxim	link
Junkmedia	3/5 stars
Lost at Sea	8.5/10 stars

Golden Ocean is the debut full-length album by rock band 50 Foot Wave. It was released in 2005 on Throwing Music.

== Track listing ==
all songs by Rob Ahlers, Bernard Georges and Kristin Hersh

1. "Long Painting" - 2:57
2. "Bone China" - 2:29
3. "Pneuma" - 3:45
4. "Clara Bow" - 3:10
5. "Petal" - 4:18
6. "Dog Days" - 3:52
7. "Sally Is a Girl" - 4:03
8. "El Dorado" - 3:15
9. "Ginger Park" - 2:53
10. "Diving" - 3:03
11. "Golden Ocean" - 3:52

== Personnel ==
- Kristin Hersh - vocals, guitars
- Bernard Georges - bass, vocals
- Rob Ahlers - drums, vocals

== Production ==
- Producers: Ethan Allen
- Engineers: Ethan Allen, James Adam Watts
- Mixing: Ethan Allen
- Mastering: Joe Gastwirt at Joe's Mastering Joint
- Design: Lakuna, Inc.
- Photography: David Narcizo and L. Fletcher
