= Eldorado (band) =

- Origin: Madrid, Spain
- Genres: Hard rock
- Years active: 2007–present
- Label: Bad Reputation
- Members: César Sánchez; Jesús Trujillo; Andrés Duende; Javier Planelles
- Past members: Nano Paramio; Alex Rada; Christian Giardino
- Website: www.eldoradorockband.com

Eldorado is a Spanish classic hard rock band formed in Madrid in 2007.

== History ==
In January 2007, bassist César Sánchez and guitarist Nano Paramio formed the band Eldorado. The band drew inspiration from 1970s classic rock groups Bad Company, Deep Purple and Led Zeppelin. After distributing some demo songs, the group was picked up by producer Richard Chycki, who has worked with Aerosmith, Dream Theater, Gotthard, and Rush. Furthermore, Richard Chycki was the guitarist in Winter Rose, a band many may be familiar with because it also featured Dream Theater vocalist James LaBrie back in 1989.

=== First album – En Busca de Eldorado ===
With drummer Alex Rada, César Sánchez and Nano Paramio mentioned as the only members in the CD liner notes the first album En Busca de Eldorado was recorded at Estudio Uno Madrid in Madrid, Spain. Only mentioned as guest was Ignacio Vicente Torrecillas on vocals, who also played keyboards on the song En Busca De Eldorado. Another guest on the album was Jaume Pla, who played guitar on Un Mal Presentimiento, Mistreated and Identidad, while producer Richard Chycki played tambourine on Déjame Decirte and El Final. Seven tracks on the album were sung in Spanish, but the album also contained one track sung in English, a cover of Mistreated, originally recorded by Deep Purple on their album Burn. In October 2007 the group finished recording in Madrid and the album was produced & mixed by Richard Chycki in "Mixland", Toronto, Canada and mastered by Mika Jussila in Finvox Studios, Helsinki, Finland. For reasons unknown Ignacio Vicente Torrecillas was only a guest on the album and Eldorado announced their new lead vocalist to be Jesús Trujillo, who toured with the band supporting the album after its release and provided lead vocals on all subsequent albums of the band to date. The band released En Busca de Eldorado in May 2008 and toured Spain during the fall. Because of a scheduling conflict, drummer Alex Rada was unable to tour and resigned from the band; he was replaced by Javier Planelles who previously played in Madrid band 69 Revoluciones and released a self-titled album with them in 2005.

=== Second album – Dorado / Golden ===
Because En Busca de Eldorado received rave reviews, Chycki agreed to produce the band's second album, which was composed during the band's fall 2008 tour, and recorded in Toronto, Canada in June 2009. Prior to the album's release, Nano Paramio left the band at the end of 2009 to pursue another musical direction, leaving César Sánchez as the only original member of Eldorado. Nano Paramio's departure prompted an extensive search for a new guitarist. (Note: A guitarist was eventually found in December 2010 with Andres Duende.) The album was released in November 2009 as Dorado with the lyrics sung in Spanish. As on the first album there was one song in English, another cover, this time I Don't Need No Doctor, a song from 1966 by Ray Charles although classic rock fans may be more familiar with the version Humble Pie recorded in 1971. In April 2010, the English language version, Golden, was released in Europe by the record label Bad Reputation, and was followed by a North American release in September. The English version also contained the song I Don't Need No Doctor as well as four bonus tracks from the Spanish album. The album was nominated for Best Hard Rock / Metal Album for 2009 at the Independent Music Awards where it received a Vox Populi (popular vote). Its single "The House of the 7 Smokestacks", was a finalist in the Australian MusicOz Awards, and the song "Atlantico" was a finalist in an International Songwriting Composition (ISC). The band participated in a Canadian Music Week Festival.

=== Third album – Paranormal Radio / Antigravity Sound Machine ===
Eldorado worked on songs for a third album but had to wait six months while Chycki was working on production for Rush's Clockwork Angels album. The band toured with Alter Bridge and Thin Lizzy, and also had a crowd-supported fundraiser. In March 2012, the band recorded its third album, which would also be released in two languages. The Spanish edition, Paranormal Radio was released on 20 May, and the English edition, Antigravity Sound Machine, was released on 5 November. Unlike the previous releases the albums didn't contain any cover song. The album won the Best Hard Rock / Metal Album 2012 award in the Spanish Independent Music Awards. The group toured Spain as part of the "Recommended Tour" by Radio3, and also toured in Europe in March–April and September 2013. In October 2013 the band announce on their website that drummer Javier Planelles has decided to leave Eldorado for personal reasons and that he will be replaced by Christian Giardino, a Spanish drummer who has also worked for several years in Argentina as a session player in different bands.

=== Fourth album – Karma Generator / Babylonia Haze ===
According to the official website of Eldorado, in June 2014 the band again launched a crowdfunding campaign with the objective of recording a new album. The new album was recorded in August / September 2014 in Musigrama Studios in Madrid with Richard Ckycki again as the producer. The new album, like the previous two, was edited in two versions, the Spanish one "Karma Generator" and the English one "Babylonia Haze". Both were released at the beginning of 2015.

== Personnel ==
The current members of the band include:

- Jesús Trujillo – vocals, keyboard and acoustic guitar (2007–present)
- Andres Duende – guitar (2010–present)
- César Sánchez – bass (2007–present)
- Javier Planelles – drums (2008–2013) (2016–present)

Former members include:

- Nano Paramio – guitar (2007–2009)
- Alex Rada – drums (2007–2008)
- Christian Giardino – drums (2013–2016)

== Discography ==
Studio albums

Listed with Spanish version (/ English version):

- En Busca de Eldorado (2008)
- Dorado (2009) / Golden (2010)
- Paranormal Radio (2012) / Antigravity Sound Machine (2012)
- Karma Generator (2015) / Babylonia Haze (2015)
- Mundo Aéreo (2016) / Riding The Sun (2016)

== Awards ==
Company	Site	Recipient	Award	Result
2009	Independent Music Awards	Golden	Best Hard Rock / Metal album	Nominated, won Vox Populi (popular vote)
2009	Independent Music Awards	"The House of the 7 Smokestacks"	Best Hard Rock / Metal song	Nominated, won Vox Populi (popular vote)
2009	International Songwriting Competition (ISC)	"Atlantico"	Rock	Honorable Mention
2010	Australia Musicoz Awards	"The House of the 7 Smokestacks"	Best International Song	Finalist
2012	Spanish Independent Music Awards	Antigravity Sound Machine	Best Hard rock / Metal Album	Won
