= Kristin Hersh discography =

- Studio albums: 11
- Extended plays: 2
- Live albums: 4
- Singles: 10

This is the discography for the solo work of rock musician Kristin Hersh.

== Albums ==
=== Studio albums ===
List of studio albums, with selected details and chart positions
Title	Album details	Peak chart positions
Title	Album details	UK
Hips and Makers	Released: February 1, 1994; Label: 4AD, Sire, Reprise	7
Strange Angels	Released: February 3, 1998; Label: 4AD/Rykodisc	64
Murder, Misery and Then Goodnight	Released: October 26, 1998; Label: 4AD	—
Sky Motel	Released: July 20, 1999; Label: 4AD	—
Sunny Border Blue	Released: March 12, 2001; Label: 4AD	93
The Grotto	Released: March 17, 2003; Label: 4AD	—
Learn to Sing Like a Star	Released: January 23, 2007; Label: 4AD, Yep Roc	—
Crooked	Released: 2010; Label: Throwing Music	—
Wyatt at the Coyote Palace	Released: 2016; Label: Throwing Music	—
Possible Dust Clouds	Released: October 5, 2018; Label: Fire	—
Clear Pond Road	Released: September 8, 2023; Label: Fire	—
Sugar On Blackstone	Released: September 18, 2026; Label: Fire	—

=== Live albums ===
List of live albums, with selected details
Title	Album details
Live at Maxwell's	Released: 1992; Label: 4AD
Live at Noe Valley Ministry	Released: August 12, 2001; Label: Throwing Music
Instant Live: Paradise Boston, Ma. 1/28/05	Released: April 19, 2005; Label: Instant Live Rec.
Cats and Mice	Released: June 22, 2010; Label: Kitten Charmer

== EPs ==
List of EPs, with selected details and chart positions
Title	EP details	Peak chart positions
Title	EP details	UK
Strings	Released: June 14, 1994; Label: 4AD, Sire, Reprise	60
The Holy Single	Released: October 31, 1995; Label: Rykodisc/Throwing Music	—

== Singles ==
List of singles, with selected details and chart positions
Year	Title	Peak chart positions	Album	B-sides
Year	Title	UK	Album	B-sides
1994	"Your Ghost"	45	Hips and Makers	"The Key", "Uncle June and Aunt Kiyoti" and "When the Levee Breaks"
1994	"A Loon"	—	Hips and Makers	
1998	"Like You"	170	Strange Angels	"Shake" (live) and "Your Ghost" (live)
1999	"Echo"	79	Sky Motel	"Pennyroyal Tea" and "Everybody's Got Something to Hide Except for Me and My Monkey"
1999	"A Cleaner Light"	—	Sky Motel	"Hate My Way" (acoustic), "Garoux Des Larmes" (acoustic) and "Cry Baby Cry" (acoustic)
2001	"Your Dirty Answer"	—	Sunny Border Blue	
2003	"Sno Cat"	—	The Grotto	
2003	"Deep Wilson"	—	The Grotto	
2007	"In Shock"	—	Learn to Sing Like a Star	"Windowpane", "Blackstone" and "Poor Wayfaring Stranger"
2007	"Winter"	—	Learn to Sing Like a Star	
2014	"Sundrops"	—		"The Cuckoo" (BBC session recordings dated 1994)
