= Nano–Mugen Compilation 2011 =

Nano-Mugen Compilation 2011

Compilation album by Various artists
- Released: June 29, 2011
- Genres: Alternative rock, punk rock, Indie
- Length: 42:47 (Disc. 1); 45:35 (Disc. 2)
- Label: Ki/oon (KSCL-1840, 1841)

Nano-Mugen chronology
Nano-Mugen Compilation 2009 (2009)	Nano-Mugen Compilation 2011 (2011)	Nano-Mugen Compilation 2012 (2012)

Asian Kung-Fu Generation Presents: Nano–Mugen Compilation 2011 is the fifth compilation album released by Asian Kung-Fu Generation to advertise their annual Nano-Mugen Festival. The album was released on June 29, 2011, in conjunction with the ninth edition of the festival, held at the Yokohama Arena from July 16 to July 17 of the same year. In addition to two new songs from Asian Kung-Fu Generation, the record also includes tracks from Weezer, Manic Street Preachers, and other bands that performed at 2011 Nano-Mugen Festival. It appeared four times on the Oricon albums chart, peaking at number 17.

== Track listing ==
Disc. 1
No.	Title	Artist(s)	Length
1.	"All Right Part 2"	Asian Kung-Fu Generation & Eriko Hashimoto (Chatmonchy)	3:35
2.	"Arcadia"	Ash	4:04
3.	"Back on My Feet"	Boom Boom Satellites	6:13
4.	"Sayonara Teenage"	Dr. Downer	4:12
5.	"Yoake Mae" (夜明けまえ; Before the Dawn)	Kenichi Hasegawa	5:39
6.	"My Own Worst Enemy"	The Hiatus	3:50
7.	"Fushigi na Chime" (符思議なチャイム; A Chime Marks)	Masafumi Isobe	3:40
8.	"Over and Over"	The Koxx	2:42
9.	"Neverland"	Lostage	5:21
10.	"(It's Not War) Just the End of Love"	Manic Street Preachers	3:27

Disc. 2
No.	Title	Artist(s)	Length
1.	"Contact" (コンタクト)	Mowmow Lulu Gyaban	4:25
2.	"Mustang"	Nada Surf	4:20
3.	"Sukitōru Shōdō" (透き通る衝動; Transparent Impulse)	Negoto	3:22
4.	"Venus"	Oorutaichi	7:39
5.	"Ghetto Burnin'"	Phonat	4:41
6.	"A Rose Is a Rose" (Nano-Mugen remix)	The Rentals & Masafumi Gotoh	3:19
7.	"Clarity" (Stout version)	Straightener	4:32
8.	"Memories"	Weezer	3:16
9.	"SugarCandySuperNova"	The Young Punx	3:57
10.	"Hikari" (ひかり; Light)	Asian Kung-Fu Generation	5:59
