= Nano–Mugen Compilation 2009 =

Nano-Mugen Compilation 2009

Compilation album by Various artists
- Released: July 1, 2009
- Genre: Alternative rock, Punk rock, Indie
- Label: Ki/oon/Tsutaya Records; KSCL-1407

Nano-Mugen chronology
Nano-Mugen Compilation 2008 (2008)	Nano-Mugen Compilation 2009 (2009)	Nano-Mugen Compilation 2011 (2011)

Nano–Mugen Compilation 2009 is a compilation album released by Asian Kung-Fu Generation to advertise their eighth annual Nano-Mugen Festival, held at the Yokohama Arena through July 19-20th. It collected songs from various artists performing at the festival, such as Nada Surf and Unicorn, in addition to a new song from Asian Kung-Fu Generation. Rockin'On called the album "an excellent disc"; it peaked at number 11 on the Oricon Albums Chart.

== Track listing ==
1. "Yoru no Call" (夜のコール; "Call of the Night") – Asian Kung-Fu Generation
2. "Zak and Sara" – Ben Folds
3. "Stereotypes" - Farrah
4. "Oats We Sow" – Gregory and the Hawk
5. "Suburban Knights" – Hard-Fi
6. "Silver Birch" – The Hiatus
7. "Morning Sun" – Ryujin Kiyoshi
8. "Surrender" – Lostage
9. "Everything Must Go" – Manic Street Preachers
10. "Marm" – Mudy on the Sakuban
11. "Weightless" – Nada Surf
12. "Pinhole" (ピンホール, Pinhōru) – Ogre You Asshole
13. "Night Fishing Is Good" (ナイトフィッシングイズグッド, Naito Fisshingu Izu Guddo) – Sakanaction
14. "8823" – Spitz
15. "Magic Blue Van" – Straightener
16. "Rock Star (Understand)" – The Young Punx
17. "Hello (Yomigaeru Live Version)" (HELLO(蘇えるライブバージョン), Hello Yomigaeru Raibu Bājon) – Unicorn
