= Nano-Mugen Festival =

Annual music festival in Japan

ASIAN KUNG-FU GENERATION presents NANO-MUGEN FES.
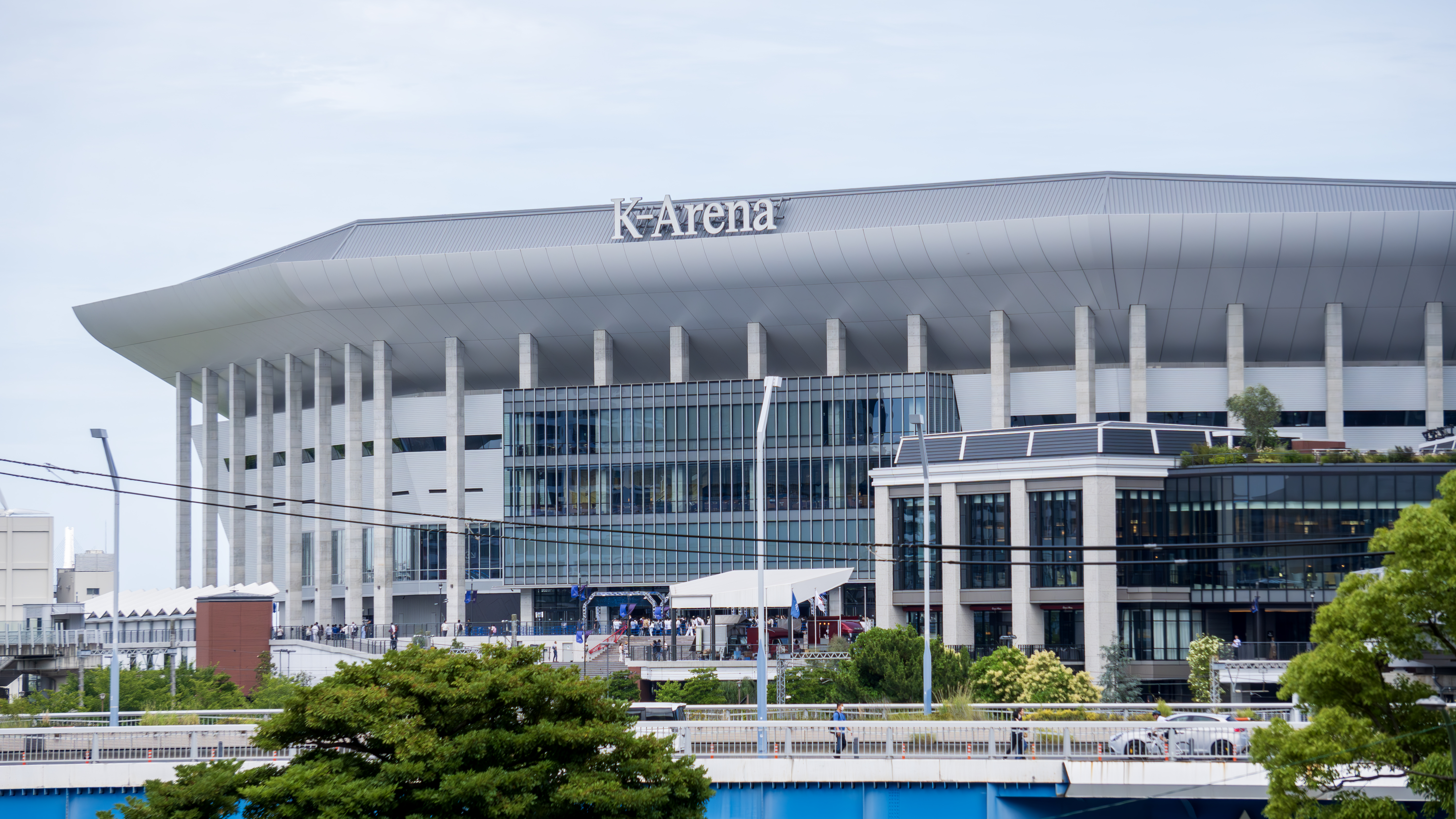
- K-Arena Yokohama, the venue for the Japan leg of Nano-Mugen Fes. 2025
- Genre: Rock music, Pop music, Electronic music, various
- Dates: Varies, usually in July
- Locations: Yokohama, Japan (2003); Tokyo, Japan (2003, 2004); Osaka, Japan (2004); Yokohama, Japan (2005–present); Jakarta, Indonesia (2025; cancelled)
- Years active: 2003–2014 (except 2007), 2025–present
- Website: Official site

Nano-Mugen Festival (officially ASIAN KUNG-FU GENERATION presents NANO-MUGEN FES., Japanese: アジアン カンフー ジェネレーション プレゼンツ ナノ-ムゲン フェス) is a music festival usually held in Yokohama, Japan.

The festival is hosted by Japanese rock band Asian Kung-Fu Generation, who invites various other artists from around Japan and internationally to perform at the festival. From the 2005 edition, the band also started producing a compilation album featuring music of each invited artist for that year's festival.

In 2025, the festival was to be held overseas for the first time, with dates in both Yokohama, Japan and Jakarta, Indonesia. However, the Indonesian leg was cancelled a few days prior to the festival.

== Background ==
The festival started as a band project, with Asian Kung-Fu Generation becoming familiar with artists from outside Japan and had formed an idea to perform together. Gotoh stated that he wanted their music to reach audiences beyond just Japanese listeners, and so the festival was created to "bridge that gap".

=== Name origin ===
"Nano" comes from the unit prefix nano, which Gotoh described as the smallest unit he and the band knew at the time. "Mugen" comes from the Japanese word 無限 (mugen) meaning "infinite" or "eternal". This means that the title is an oxymoron.

According to Gotoh, he had an "image of something expanding endlessly from the smallest point" and therefore is "a title about expanding from the smallest unit to a place beyond measure."

== Festival history ==
=== NANO-MUGEN FES. (Shinjuku LOFT) ===
The first Nano-Mugen Fes. was held at Shinjuku LOFT on August 11, 2003. It was a single day festival featuring five total acts.

| Date | Venue | Artists |
|---|---|---|
| August 11 | Shinjuku LOFT | ASIAN KUNG-FU GENERATION; ART-SCHOOL; PEALOUT; Tsubakiya Shijūsō; HOT SCLAP |

=== NANO-MUGEN FES. (Yokohama CLUB24) ===
The second festival was held on December 17, 2003 at Yokohama CLUB24.

| Date | Venue | Artists |
|---|---|---|
| December 17 | Yokohama CLUB24 | Asian Kung-Fu Generation; STRAIGHTENER; TELSTAR (band); FREEZER NOISE |

=== NANO-MUGEN FES. in Budokan ===
The third festival was held on July 1, 2004 at Nippon Budokan.

| Date | Venue | Artists |
|---|---|---|
| July 1 | Nippon Budokan | Asian Kung-Fu Generation; ACIDMAN; GOING UNDER GROUND; Straightener |

=== NANO-MUGEN FES. in OSAKA ===
The fourth festival was held on August 9, 2004 at Osaka Namba Hatch. It is the first edition to feature international acts.

| Date | Venue | Artists |
|---|---|---|
| August 9 | Osaka Namba Hatch | Asian Kung-Fu Generation; Zebrahead (US); The Cribs (UK) |

=== NANO-MUGEN FES. 2005 ===
2005 was the first festival to be held at new permanent venue Yokohama Arena, and the first to feature a compilation album.

| Date | Venue | Area | Performers |
|---|---|---|---|
| July 9 | Yokohama Arena | A Stage | Ash (UK); Dogs Die in Hot Cars (UK); Ellegarden; SPARTA LOCALS |
| July 9 | Yokohama Arena | B Stage | Asian-Kung Fu Generation; Farrah (UK); Industrial Salt (UK); Straightener |

=== NANO-MUGEN FES. 2006 ===
The festival became a two-day event in the 2006 edition.

| Dates | Venue | Area | Performers |
|---|---|---|---|
| July 16 | Yokohama Arena | Band Stage | Asian Kung-Fu Generation; The Rentals (US); Silver Sun (US); Ellegarden; MO'SOME TONEBENDER; Chatmonchy |
| July 16 | Yokohama Arena | Acoustic & DJ Stage | The Young Punx (UK); Dream State (US) |
| July 17 | Yokohama Arena | Band Stage | Asian Kung-Fu Generation; The Rentals (US); Silver Sun (UK); Beat Crusaders; Straightener; HiGE |
| July 17 | Yokohama Arena | Acoustic & DJ Stage | The Young Punx (UK); Waking Ashland (US) |

=== NANO-MUGEN FES. 2008 ===
Whilst the organisers received offers from bands wanting to participate in 2007, a decision was ultimately made to postpone the festival so that Asian Kung-Fu Generation could focus on performing at other festivals and events.

The festival returned to Yokohama Arena in 2008, once again for two days.

| Dates | Venue | Performers |
|---|---|---|
| July 20 | Yokohama Arena | Asian Kung-Fu Generation; Ash (UK); The Young Punx (UK); Stereophonics (UK); Phantom Planet (US); Straightener; Analogfish; 9mm Parabellum Bullet; Shugo Tokumaru |
| July 21 | Yokohama Arena | Asian Kung-Fu Generation; Ash (UK); Space Cowboy (UK); Hellogoodbye (US); Third Eye Blind (US); Ellegarden; Art-School; Special Others; 8otto |

=== NANO-MUGEN FES. 2009 ===
Welsh band Manic Street Preachers was originally scheduled to appear, however their participation was cancelled due to the sudden illness of bassist Nicky Wire. Refunds were given upon request.

| Dates | Venue | Performers |
|---|---|---|
| July 19 | Yokohama Arena | Asian Kung-Fu Generation; Manic Street Preachers (UK) (cancelled); Nada Surf (US); Ben Folds (US); Hard-Fi (UK); The Young Punx (UK); Straightener; The Hiatus; OGRE YOU ASSHOLE; Ryujin Kiyoshi |
| July 20 | Yokohama Arena | Asian Kung-fu Generation; Manic Street Preachers (UK) (cancelled); Nada Surf (US); Ben Folds (US); HARD-Fi (UK); The Young Punx (UK); Farrah (UK); Spitz; Unicorn; Sakanaction |

==== NANO-MUGEN FES. 2009 (pre-event) ====
Prior to the main festival, the band also hosted events in Osaka and Nagoya on July 9 and 10, along with a solo show in Tokyo.

| Dates | City | Venue | Performers |
|---|---|---|---|
| July 6 | Tokyo | Daikanyama UNIT | Asian Kung-Fu Generation |
| July 9 | Osaka | Namba Hatch | Asian Kung-Fu Generation; Gregory and the Hawk (US); LOSTAGE |
| July 10 | Nagoya | Zepp Nagoya | Asian Kung-Fu Generation; Gregory and the Hawk (US); mudy on the sakuban |

=== NANO-MUGEN CIRCUIT 2010 ===
In lieu of a full festival in 2010, the band instead hosted a tour with stops in four cities across Japan.

| Dates | City | Venue | Performers |
|---|---|---|---|
| July 21 | Hiroshima | Hiroshima Club Quattro | Asian Kung-Fu Generation; Ra Ra Riot (US); Predawn |
| July 23 | Yokohama | Yokohama BLITZ | Asian Kung-Fu Generation; Ra Ra Riot (US); MOWMOW LULU GYABAN |
| July 24 | Tokyo | Zepp Tokyo | Asian Kung-Fu Generation; Ra Ra Riot (US); 環ROY; Telstar |
| July 27 | Kyoto | KBS Hall | Asian Kung-Fu Generation; Ra Ra Riot (US); Eiko Ishibashi × Achiko; DJ Dawa (Flake Records); TORA (8otto) |
| July 28 | Kyoto | KBS Hall | Asian Kung-Fu Generation; Ra Ra Riot (US); Olde Worlde; DJ Dawa (Flake Records); TORA (8otto) |

=== NANO-MUGEN CIRCUIT 2011 ===
Held in three cities across Japan.

| Dates | City | Venue | Performers |
|---|---|---|---|
| July 4 | Tokyo | Liquid Room | Asian Kung-Fu Generation; Dr. Downer; Kenichi Hasegawa |
| July 5 | Tokyo | Studio Coast | Asian Kung-Fu Generation; Nada Surf (US); The Koxx (KR) |
| July 7 | Osaka | Zepp Osaka | Asian Kung-Fu Generation; Nada Surf (US); The Koxx (KR) |
| July 8 | Nagoya | Zepp Nagoya | Asian Kung-Fu Generation; Nada Surf (US); LOSTAGE |

=== NANO-MUGEN FES. 2011 ===
Nano-Mugen returned to Yokohama Arena as a two-day festival.

| Dates | Venue | Area | Performers |
|---|---|---|---|
| July 16 | Yokohama Arena | Band Stage | Asian Kung-Fu Generation; We Are Scientists (US); Weezer (US); Ash (UK); The Hiatus; Masafumi Isobe BAND; Negoto |
| July 16 | Yokohama Arena | Acoustic Stage | The Rentals (US) |
| July 16 | Yokohama Arena | DJ Stage | The Young Punx and Phonat (UK); OORUTAICHI |
| July 17 | Yokohama Arena | Band Stage | Asian Kung-Fu Generation; We Are Scientists (US); Manic Street Preachers (UK); Motoharu Sano and the Hobo King Band; Boom Boom Satellites; Straightener; mowmowlulugyaban |
| July 17 | Yokohama Arena | Acoustic Stage | The Rentals (US); Gen Hoshino |
| July 17 | Yokohama Arena | DJ Stage | The Young Punx and Phonat (UK) |

=== NANO-MUGEN CIRCUIT 2012 ===
Held in four cities across Japan.

| Dates | City | Venue | Performers |
|---|---|---|---|
| June 4 | Hiroshima | Hiroshima Club Quattro | Asian Kung-Fu Generation; Ozma (US); The Cigavettes |
| June 5 | Osaka | Umeda Club Quattro | Asian Kung-Fu Generation; Ozma (US); Ai Iwasaki |
| June 7 | Nagoya | Nagoya Club Quattro | Asian Kung-Fu Generation; Ozma (US); QUATTRO |
| June 8 | Tokyo | Zepp DiverCity | Asian Kung-Fu Generation; Ozma (US); Bloodthirsty Butchers; the chef cooks me |

=== NANO-MUGEN FES. 2012 ===
| Dates | Venue | Area | Performers |
|---|---|---|---|
| July 15 | Yokohama Arena | Band Stage | Asian Kung-Fu Generation; Fountains of Wayne (US); Motion City Soundtrack (US); Mates of State (US); Feeder (UK); Dr. Downer; Kreva; Straightener |
| July 15 | Yokohama Arena | Dance Stage | Space Cowboy (UK) |
| July 15 | Yokohama Arena | Acoustic Stage | Motohiro Hata |
| July 15 | Yokohama Arena | kiyoshi's bar GUESTReALM | Phonotones |
| July 16 | Yokohama Arena | Band Stage | Asian Kung-Fu Generation; Fountains of Wayne (US); Mates of State (US); Suede (UK); Chara; 10-Feet; Chatmonchy; The Hiatus |
| July 16 | Yokohama Arena | Dance Stage | Space Cowboy (UK); 80kidz |
| July 16 | Yokohama Arena | Acoustic Stage | Motion City Soundtrack (US); Rina Kitahara |
| July 16 | Yokohama Arena | kiyoshi's bar GUESTReALM | Phonotones |

=== NANO-MUGEN CIRCUIT 2013 ===
Held in six cities across Japan.

| Dates | City | Venue | Performers |
|---|---|---|---|
| June 14 | Kyoto | KBS Hall | Asian Kung-Fu Generation; Sara Radle (ex-The Rentals) (US); Special Others; Skirt |
| June 15 | Kyoto | KBS Hall | Asian Kung-Fu Generation; The chef cooks me; Phonotones; Turntable Films |
| June 17 | Matsuyama | Matsuyama City Community Center | Asian Kung-Fu Generation; Radical Dads (US); Straightener; Dr. Downer |
| June 19 | Kumamoto | Drum Be-9 V1 | Asian Kung-fu Generation; Radical Dads (US); Ai Iwasaki; Now the bear man |
| June 24 | Niigata | Niigata LOTS | Asian Kung-Fu Generation; Radical Dads (US); Cero |
| June 26 | Sendai | Sendai Rensa | Asian Kung-fu Generation; Radical Dads (US); Umi-no-te |
| June 28 | Tokyo | Tokyo Dome City Hall | Asian Kung-Fu Generation; Radical Dads (US); The chef cooks me; Shamcats |

=== NANO-MUGEN FES. 2014 ===
2014 was to be the final annual Nano-Mugen Festival, and the most recently released compilation album.

| Dates | Venue | Area | Performers |
|---|---|---|---|
| July 12 | Yokohama Arena | Band Stage | Asian Kung-Fu Generation; Good Morning America (Side Stage); KANA-BOON; LOSTAGE (Side Stage); Owl City (US); Quruli; The Rentals (US); Straightener; Tegan and Sara (CA) |
| July 12 | Yokohama Arena | Electric Stage | The Young Punx (UK); It's a Musical (DE & SE) |
| July 12 | Yokohama Arena | Ken's Cafe | 猪股 and the guitar; Ai Iwasaki; Ropes (duo) |
| July 12 | Yokohama Arena | kiyoshi's bar GUESTReALM | Arisa Safu; Hi, how are you?; Yasu Nakajima (BIGNOUN) |
| July 13 | Yokohama Arena | Band Stage | Asian Kung-Fu Generation; The chef cooks me; The Hiatus; Nico Touches the Walls (Acoustic) (Side Stage); Owl City (US); The Rentals (US); Tegan and Sara (CA); Tokyo Ska Paradise Orchestra; Unicorn |
| July 13 | Yokohama Arena | Electric Stage | The Young Punx (UK); It's a Musical (DE & SE) |
| July 13 | Yokohama Arena | Ken's Cafe | Rina Katahira; Riki Kinoshita (ART-SCHOOL); YeYe (musician) |
| July 13 | Yokohama Arena | kiyoshi's bar GUESTReALM | Isobe Masafumi (HUSKING BEE); Kat McDowell; Ogawa Kota and Tomason |

=== NANO-MUGEN FES. 2025 ===
After an 11 year hiatus, Nano-Mugen Festival is due to return in May and June 2025 and held across two cities in Japan and Indonesia.

The first wave of artists to appear was revealed on 3 February 2025. The second wave was announced on 10 March 2025, along with the first wave of artists to appear in Jakarta.

On 19 May, festival organisers announced the cancellation of the Indonesian leg of the festival.

| Dates | City | Venue | Performers |
|---|---|---|---|
| May 24 (cancelled) | Jakarta, Indonesia | Ecopark Ancol | Asian Kung-Fu Generation; Ellegarden; Homecomings; KANA-BOON |
| May 25 (cancelled) | Jakarta, Indonesia | Ecopark Ancol | Asian Kung-Fu Generation; Beck (US); Quruli; Regallily |
| May 31 | Yokohama, Japan | K-Arena Yokohama | Asian Kung-Fu Generation; Ellegarden; Straightener; Voice of Baceprot (IDN); Special Others (Acoustic); Fountains of Wayne (US); Hovvdy (US); Nick Moon (UK); The Young Punx (UK) |
| June 1 | Yokohama, Japan | K-Arena Yokohama | Asian Kung-Fu Generation; Beck (US); The Adams (IDN); Quruli; YeYe; Fountains of Wayne (US); Hovvdy (US); Nick Moon (UK); The Young Punx (UK) |

==== NANO-MUGEN CIRCUIT 2025 ====
On the first day of Nano-Mugen Fes. 2025 in Yokohama, it was revealed that Nano-Mugen Circuit would return, this time as a "split tour" between ASH and Asian Kung-Fu Generation.

| Dates | City | Venue | Performers | Guest acts |
|---|---|---|---|---|
| October 14 | Fukuoka | Zepp Fukuoka | Asian Kung-Fu Generation; ASH | Regallily |
| October 16 | Osaka | Zepp Osaka Bayside | Asian Kung-Fu Generation; ASH | Laura day romance |
| October 17 | Nagoya | Zepp Nagoya | Asian Kung-Fu Generation; ASH | KANA-BOON |
| October 20 | Sendai | SENDAI GIGS | Asian Kung-Fu Generation; ASH | Homecomings |
| October 21 | Yokohama | KT Zepp Yokohama | Asian Kung-Fu Generation; ASH | yubiori |

=== ARABAKI ROCK FEST. 26 MICHINOKU PEACE SESSION ===
On 23 December 2025, Arabaki Rock Fest. announced Asian Kung-Fu Generation would host "MICHINOKU PEACE SESSION" at the 2026 edition of the festival, under the Nano-Mugen banner; officially "ASIAN KUNG-FU GENERATION NANO-MUGEN at ARABAKI". The session will celebrate the band's 30th anniversary and feature various guests.

The festival is scheduled for the weekend of 25 and 26 April, at Michinoku Lakeside National Government Park in Miyagi.

On 17 March 2026, the timetable and guests acts were announced, with the band hosting the Nano-Mugen session on the Saturday night.

| Dates | Stage | Performers | Guest acts |
|---|---|---|---|
| April 25 | Michinoku | Asian Kung-Fu Generation | Shigeru Kishida; Kaori Kishitani; Moeka Shiotsuka; Tokyo Ska Paradise Orchestra (horn section); TOSHI-LOW; Non; Takeshi Hosomi; Atsushi Horie |
