= Laura Kidd =

- Also known as: Penfriend (formerly She Makes War)
- Born: Laura Kidd; Salisbury, England
- Origin: London, England
- Genres: Alternative rock, pop
- Years active: 2009–present
- Label: My Big Sister Recordings
- Website: penfriend.rocks

Laura Kidd is an English record producer, songwriter and multi-instrumentalist, releasing music, videos and podcast episodes as Penfriend, and formerly known as She Makes War. After releasing four albums between 2010 and 2018, She Makes War was formally disbanded in December 2019, and Kidd launched new a music project, Penfriend, in May 2020, with an accompanying weekly podcast series, Attention Engineer. Her collaboration project with Rat (Ned's Atomic Dustbin), Obey Robots, was launched in December 2020.

== Penfriend ==
In May 2021, Kidd released her first record as Penfriend. Exotic Monsters reached number 24 in the UK Albums Chart and number 5 in the UK Independent Albums Chart.

In April 2025, she released her second album as Penfriend. House Of Stories reached number 2 in the UK Independent Albums Chart.

== Attention Engineer podcast ==
Kidd's podcast series launched on 3 June 2020, featuring conversations with other artists, musical and otherwise. One reviewer described it as "a lovely listen... As a musician herself, Kidd... talks with insight and warmth... but these are not the back-slapping all-slebs-together podcasts that we've become used to."

Guests have included Tanya Donelly (Belly / The Breeders) and Mark Chadwick (Levellers), who appeared as guest vocalists on Kidd's third She Makes War album, Direction Of Travel, plus Ayse Hassan (Savages), Frank Turner, Charlotte Hatherley, Bernard Butler, Corin Tucker, Robin Ince, Lou Barlow, Shingai and more.

== She Makes War ==
Launched in 2009 with the release of EP "Three...Two...One", She Makes War was Kidd's first solo project. Her fourth album, Brace For Impact, was released in October 2018 and secured a number 15 UK Independent Albums Chart placement on 12 October 2018. She has released three previous albums Disarm (2010), Little Battles (2012) and Direction Of Travel (2016). The project finished with the release of And Peace in 2019, intimate re-recordings of eight tracks spanning all four albums.

John Robb described Kidd in 2011 as "a modern musical Boudica," and Will Butler wrote in 2015 that she possessed "the emotional resonance of Elliott Smith colliding with the barbed vigour of Sleater-Kinney."

In 2015, She Makes War released Disarm: 15 an EP of "tender reworking of songs" from the first album.

In 2016, She Makes War's third album Direction of Travel featured guest appearances from Tanya Donelly and Mark Chadwick. Kidd played most of the instruments herself, with guests including Clive Deamer and Andy Sutor on drums, The McCarricks and Nicole Robson on strings, and Cajita on piano. The album was produced by Kidd and mixed by Dan Austin. Tanya Donelly's guest appearance on the song "Paper Thin" was described as "the perfect augmentation to Laura's beautiful lyrics."

Kidd ended the She Makes War project in 2019, citing a desire to "keep putting out the most honest, thoughtful and brave music I have inside me long into the future."

== Touring ==
As She Makes War, Kidd toured extensively in the UK and Europe both as a solo act and with a full band. She also supported Suede, The Levellers, British Sea Power, Ginger Wildheart, Tune-Yards, Gruff Rhys, The Magic Numbers, Duke Special, Midge Ure, New Model Army, Glen Matlock and Earl Slick, Nadine Shah, Erica Nockalls and Miles Hunt, Chris Helme, Drugstore and The Posies.

Kidd has also toured, providing bass and vocals, for artists including Tricky, Viv Albertine, Lil' Chris, The Penelopes, The Young Punx and Alex Parks.

== Other projects ==
In 2015, Kidd wrote and performed one-woman show Shit Girlfriend at Edinburgh Fringe, combining humorous spoken word and melancholy music performance, sharing tales of real life on the road and Kidd's ill-fated attempts at finding love.

Kidd appears as guest vocalist on Miles Hunt of The Wonder Stuff's 2022 solo album "Things Can Change", featured on the title track "Things Can Change" and "A Picture By A Stranger". She also sings on the Levellers' 2018 album "We The Collective" (featured on "Drug Bust McGee" and in the background of "Exodus" and "Subvert"), Viv Albertine's 2012 album "The Vermilion Border" on backing vocals, ukulele and handclaps and vocals on Thumpermonkey Lives! tracks "Deficit" and "The Rhetorician" from "Sleep Furiously" (2012). She co-wrote and features on several songs on The Young Punx 2010 album "Mashpop and Punkstep."

== Discography ==
=== Albums ===
==== Penfriend ====
- Exotic Monsters, 2021 (number 24 UK Albums Chart, number 8 UK Independent Albums Chart)
- House Of Stories, 2025 (number 74 UK Albums Chart, number 2 UK Independent Albums Chart)

==== Obey Robots ====
- One In A Thousand, 2023 (number 14 UK Albums Chart, number 1 UK Independent Albums Chart)

==== She Makes War ====
- Disarm, 2010
- Little Battles, 2012
- Direction of Travel, 2016
- Brace for Impact, 2018
- And Peace, 2019

=== EPs ===
- Three...Two...One.., 2009
- Disarm: The Live EP, 2010
- The Butterflies Audiovisual EP, 2013
- Disarm: 15 EP, 2015

=== Singles ===
==== Penfriend ====
- "Everything Looks Normal In The Sunshine", 2020
- ”The Only Way Out Is Through”, 2020
- ”Exotic Monsters”, 2021
- ”Cancel Your Hopes”, 2021
- ”Black Car”, 2021

==== Obey Robots ====
- "Let It Snow", 2020

==== She Makes War ====
- "Let This Be", 2010
- "I Am", 2010
- "In This Boat", 2012
- "Minefields", 2012
- "Never Was", 2013
- "Drown Me Out", 2016
- "Paper Thin", 2016
- "Cold Shoulder", 2016
- "Stargazing", 2016
- "I Want My Country Back", 2017
- "Do You Really Want To Hurt Me", 2018
- "Devastate Me", 2018
- "Undone \ London Bites", 2018
