= Shiranai Aizu Shiraseru Ko =

EP by Ogre You Asshole
- Released: 2008
- Genre: Indie rock
- Length: 22:01

Ogre You Asshole chronology
Alphabeta vs. Lambda (2007)	Shiranai Aizu Shiraseru Ko (2008)	Pinhole (2009)

Shiranai Aizu Shiraseru Ko (しらない合図しらせる子, The Child to Tell of the Unknown Sign) is a song by Japanese rock band Ogre You Asshole and the title track of their second Mini Album released independently on November 5, 2008.

== Track listing ==
1. Shiranai Aizu Shiraseru Ko (しらない合図しらせる子, The Child to Tell of the Unknown Sign)
2. Rail (レール, Rēru)
3. Nadaraka Nanda (なだらかなんだ, I'm Gentle)
4. Hitori Nori (ひとり乗り, One Ride)
5. Katappo (かたっぽ, Pair)
