= Heikin wa Sayuu Gyaku no Kitai =

EP by Ogre You Asshole
- Released: 2006
- Genre: Indie rock
- Length: 22:03

Ogre You Asshole chronology
Ogre You Asshole (2005)	Heikin wa Sayuu Gyaku no Kitai (2006)	Alphabeta vs. Lambda (2007)

Heikin wa Sayuu Gyaku no Kitai (平均は左右逆の期待, The Average is the Opposite Expectation of Left and Right) is a song by Japanese rock band Ogre You Asshole and the title track of their first EP released independently on October 10, 2005.

== Track listing ==
1. Atari wa Koko (辺りはここ, Right Here)
2. Advantage (アドバンテージ, Adobantēji)
3. Heikin wa Sayuu Gyaku no Kitai (平均は左右逆の期待, The Average is the Opposite Expectation of Left and Right)
4. Pull ring (プルリング, Pururingu)
5. Nidai (2台, Two)
