= Strings (EP) =

1994 EP by Kristin Hersh

EP by Kristin Hersh
- Released: April 5, 1994
- Genre: Alternative Rock
- Length: 30:39
- Label: 4AD, Sire
- Producer: Lenny Kaye, Kristin Hersh

Professional ratings
Review scores
Source	Rating
AllMusic	3.5/5 stars

Strings is an extended play (EP) by American singer-songwriter Kristin Hersh, released in April 1994. It peaked at number 60 on the UK Singles Chart.

== Track listing ==
All songs were written by Kristin Hersh except where noted.

1. "Beestung" - 3:09
2. "A Loon" (strings version) - 4:25
3. "Sundrops" (strings version) - 4:11
4. "Me and My Charms" (strings version) - 4:31
5. "Velvet Days" (strings version) - 3:44
6. "The Key" - 3:36
7. "Uncle June and Aunt Kiyoti" - 2:33 (Kristin Hersh and W.J. Hersh)
8. "When the Levee Breaks" - 4:35 (Memphis Minnie, Robert Plant, Jimmy Page, John Paul Jones and John Bonham)

The original UK release (4AD BAD 4006 CD) featured only tracks two, three, four, and five. Tracks six, seven, and eight originally featured as extra tracks on the CD and 12-inch "Your Ghost" single.

== Personnel ==
- Kristin Hersh – vocals and guitars
- Martin McCarrick – cello and string arrangements
- Jane Scarpantoni – cello
- Wilfred Gibson – violin
- Perry Montague-Mason – violin
- Gavin Wright – violin
- Billy McGee – double bass
- Production: Lenny Kaye and Kristin Hersh
- Engineering: Paul Q. Kolderie, Steve Rizzo, Phil Brown and John Fryer
- Mixing: Martin McCarrick, Bill O'Connell and John Fryer
- Design: Vaughan Oliver

== "The Key" ==
"The Key" appeared on Secret Tracks 2, a cassette given away with Select. "I had this instrumental to finish but I wasn't hearing any words," Hersh said in the accompanying notes. "Then I opened this Krazy Kat comic from the '30s and there were all these beautiful words. So I re-wrote the song, took it apart, put it back together – and then I opened up the book again and none of those words were there. Honest to God! It was like this song was just kicking me in the head: 'Goddammit, whaddya need?! Alright, we'll write it in a comic book for ya, dipshit!'"
