= Crooked (album) =

Studio album by Kristin Hersh
- Released: July 19, 2010
- Recorded: December 2009–April 2010
- Genres: Indie rock, folk
- Length: 41:16
- Label: Throwing Music
- Producer: Kristin Hersh

Kristin Hersh chronology
Learn to Sing Like a Star (2007)	Crooked (2010)	Wyatt at the Coyote Palace (2016)

Professional ratings
Review scores
Source	Rating
The Washington Post	(favorable)
Wears the Trousers	(7/10)

Crooked is Kristin Hersh's eighth studio album, produced by Hersh. The album was released in the form of a book containing song lyrics, artwork and a code to download the music digitally.

In 2019, the album was re-released by Fire Records in both vinyl and cd formats, to mark the 10th anniversary of its original release. In these re-editions, the song order has been altered, with "Moan", "Sand" and "Glass" now the first three tracks, and "Mississippi Kite" becoming track #4.

== Track listing ==
All tracks are written by Kristin Hersh.

No.	Title	Length
1.	"Mississippi Kite"	3:36
2.	"Moan"	4:58
3.	"Sand"	3:06
4.	"Glass"	3:33
5.	"Fortune"	4:18
6.	"Coals"	5:20
7.	"Crooked"	3:11
8.	"Krait"	5:40
9.	"Flooding"	4:00
10.	"Rubidoux"	3:39

== Personnel ==
- Kristin Hersh – all vocals and instruments

== Production ==
- Producer: Kristin Hersh
- Recorded and Mixed by Steve Rizzo
- Mastering: Joe Gastwirt
- Design: Jesse von Doom
