= Nano–Mugen Compilation 2012 =

Nano-Mugen Compilation 2012

Compilation album by Various artists
- Released: June 27, 2012
- Label: Ki/oon (KSCL-2056, 2057)

Nano-Mugen chronology
Nano-Mugen Compilation 2011 (2011)	Nano-Mugen Compilation 2012 (2012)	Nano-Mugen Compilation 2013 (2013)

Asian Kung-Fu Generation Presents: Nano–Mugen Compilation 2012 is a compilation album released by Asian Kung-Fu Generation on June 27, 2012 to advertise their tenth annual Nano-Mugen Festival, to be held at the Yokohama Arena on July 15 and 16. It features songs from Asian Kung-Fu Generation, Motion City Soundtrack, Straightener, and other bands that will perform for the 2012 Nano-Mugen Festival and have performed on Nano-Mugen Circuit from June 4 to June 8 of the same year.

== Track listing ==
Disc. 1
No.	Title	Artist(s)	Length
1.	"Yoru o Koete" (夜を越えて; Beyond the night)	Asian Kung-Fu Generation
2.	"Flanging Sun" (フランジングサン)	Bloodthirsty Butchers
3.	"Alterna Girlfriend" (オルタナ・ガールフレンド)	Chara
4.	"Yes or No or Love"	Chatmonchy
5.	"Pascal & Electus"	The Chef Cooks Me
6.	"We Rolled Again"	The Cigavettes
7.	"Lost Hope" (ロストホープ)	Dr. Downer
8.	"Turbo Town"	80 Kidz
9.	"Idaho"	Feeder
10.	"Someone's Gonna Break Your Heart"	Fountains of Wayne
11.	"Asa ga Kuru Mae ni" (朝が来る前に; Before the Morning Comes)	Motohiro Hata

Disc. 2
No.	Title	Artist(s)	Length
1.	"Superblock"	The Hiatus
2.	"Tokyo Life" (東京 LIFE)	Ai Iwasaki
3.	"Hajimari ni" (始まりに; The Beginning)	Rina Katahira
4.	"Palomino"	Mates of State
5.	"True Romance"	Motion City Soundtrack
6.	"Underneath My Tree"	Ozma
7.	"The World Is Yours"	Phono Tones
8.	"Hodoketa Kutsuhimo" (ほどけた靴紐; Undone Shoelace)	Quattro
9.	"Nexus" (acoustic)	Straightener
10.	"Trash"	Suede
11.	"Sabishisa ni Hi o Kube" (淋しさに火をくべ; Kube Set Fire to the Loneliness)	10-Feet
