= The Holy Single =

Studio album by Kristin Hersh
- Released: October 31, 1995
- Genre: Alternative Rock
- Length: 11:09
- Label: Rykodisc/Throwing Muses
- Producer: Kristin Hersh

Professional ratings
Review scores
| Source | Rating |
|---|---|
| Allmusic | link |

The Holy Single is an EP recording by Kristin Hersh, released in 1995 (see 1995 in music).

== Track listing ==
1. "Jesus Christ" - 2:25 (Alex Chilton)
2. "Amazing Grace" - 3:30 (Traditional: Arranged by Kristin Hersh)
3. "Sinkhole" - 3:14 (W. J. Hersh)
4. "Can The Circle Be Unbroken" - 2:50 (A. P. Carter)

== Personnel ==
- Kristin Hersh - vocals and all instruments

== Production ==
- Producer: Kristin Hersh
- Engineer: Steve Rizzo
- Design: David Narcizo/Mary Ann Southard
- Artwork: Dylan Hersh Going
