= Hips and Makers =

Studio album by Kristin Hersh
- Released: January 24, 1994
- Recorded: April–October 1993
- Studio: Stable Sound, Portsmouth, Rhode Island
- Genre: Indie rock, folk
- Length: 50:21
- Label: 4AD, Sire
- Producer: Lenny Kaye, Kristin Hersh

Kristin Hersh chronology
Hips and Makers (1994)	Strange Angels (1998)

Singles from Hips and Makers
- 1. "Your Ghost" Released: January 10, 1994; 2. "A Loon (as Strings EP)" Released: April 5, 1994

Hips and Makers is the debut solo album by Kristin Hersh, best known as the primary singer and songwriter of the band Throwing Muses. The album was released by 4AD in the UK on January 24, 1994, and by Sire Records in the US on February 1, 1994. In contrast to Hersh's rock-oriented work with Throwing Muses, the album is primarily acoustic, with Hersh usually playing unaccompanied. Other credited musicians include Jane Scarpantoni on cello and Michael Stipe of R.E.M., who sings backing vocals on the opening track, "Your Ghost". In addition to Hersh's own material, the album features a cover of the traditional song "The Cuckoo".

"It's personal, literally so", Hersh said, "full of skin and coffee, shoes and sweat and babies and sex and food and stores – just stupid stuff that's really a big deal."

Hips and Makers peaked at number seven on the UK Albums Chart, the highest placing of any of Hersh's offerings on her own or with Throwing Muses. In the United States, the album peaked at number 197 on the Billboard 200 albums chart, and also peaked at number 10 on the Billboard Heatseekers chart.

== Reception ==
Professional ratings
Review scores
Source	Rating
AllMusic	4.5/5 stars
Chicago Tribune	2.5/4 stars
Entertainment Weekly	B−
Los Angeles Times	3/4 stars
NME	8/10
Record Collector	4/5 stars
Rolling Stone	4/5 stars
The Rolling Stone Album Guide	4/5 stars
Select	4/5
Spin Alternative Record Guide	9/10

Critics were mostly positive about Hips and Makers on its release. "[I]t's clear that a Belly-style pop accommodation is just not what Hersh is aiming for", observed David Cavanagh in Select. "Her peers are [Bob] Mould and, more particularly, Michael Stipe". "[S]he is as accomplished a singer/songwriter as [Tanya] Donnelly", noted James Delingpole in The Sunday Telegraph. "The only place where it falls down is that the arrangements are so sparse (it's just Hersh on acoustic guitar or piano with the odd bit of cello accompaniment – very Suzanne Vega) that the songs though cute all start to sound a bit samey."

Spin's Simon Reynolds raved that "[a]t once oppressive and impressive, Hips and Makers signals a rejuvenation for Hersh's muse", while Rolling Stone's Stephanie Zacharek called it "[l]uminous, alluring and slightly menacing". On the other hand, Robert Christgau gave it a grade of "neither" and left no further comment. "Despite the delicate good looks of 'Velvet Days' and the title track," decided Andrew Collins in Q, "it advances the Hersh cause for acceptance no further."

In a retrospective review, AllMusic critic Richie Unterberger noted that the material was of an "intensely personal nature" and offered with "a despairing and introspective tone that fails to submerge her considerable inner strength and fortitude".

== Track listing ==
All tracks composed by Kristin Hersh; except where indicated

1. "Your Ghost" – 3:16
2. "Beestung" – 3:08
3. "Teeth" – 4:10
4. "Sundrops" – 4:02
5. "Sparky" – 1:29
6. "Houdini Blues" (Kristin Hersh, William James Hersh) – 4:26
7. "A Loon" – 4:18
8. "Velvet Days" – 3:52
9. "Close Your Eyes" – 5:27
10. "Me and My Charms" – 4:16
11. "Tuesday Night" – 3:03
12. "The Letter" – 2:47
13. "Lurch" – 0:36
14. "The Cuckoo" (traditional; arranged by Kristin Hersh) – 2:12
15. "Hips and Makers" – 3:19

== Personnel ==
- Kristin Hersh – guitar, vocals
- Jane Scarpantoni – cello
- Michael Stipe – additional vocals on "Your Ghost"

Technical

- Phill Brown – engineer
- Steve Rizzo – assistant engineer
- Vaughan Oliver – design
- Shinro Ohtake – artwork
- Andrew Catlin – photography

== Charts ==
Chart (1994)	Peak position
Dutch Albums (Album Top 100)	11
European Top 100 Albums (Music & Media)	43
German Albums (Offizielle Top 100)	61
New Zealand Albums (RMNZ)	42
Scottish Albums (OCC)	59
UK Albums (OCC)	7
UK Independent Albums (OCC)	1
US Billboard 200	197
US Heatseekers Albums (Billboard)	10
