= The McCarricks =

Acclaimed husband and wife musical duo

The McCarricks are the husband and wife band of Martin McCarrick on cello and Kimberlee McCarrick on violin. they have collaborated widely, including Kristin Hersh, Sinéad O'Connor, Gary Numan, Marianne Faithfull and Patti Smith's Meltdown concerts at the Royal Festival Hall in London. Their solo performances are in front of silent films produced specially for their performances.

== Discography ==
=== The McCarricks ===
The McCarricks 2007 - "3"

=== Collaborations ===
Learn to Sing Like a Star - Kristin Hersh - 2007
