= 100-nengo =

Studio album by Ogre You Asshole
- Released: 2012
- Genre: Indie rock
- Length: 41:00
- Label: VAP

Ogre You Asshole chronology
Dope (2012)	100-nengo (2012)	Confidential (2013)

100-nengo (100年後) is an album by Japanese rock band Ogre You Asshole, released on September 19, 2012. It was their third album on a major label and peaked at number 47 on the Oricon album chart. The band toured Japan in October and November in support of the album.

== Track listing ==
1. Korekara (これから)
2. Yoru no Fune (夜の船)
3. Suteki na Yokan (素敵な予感)
4. Hyakunengo (100年後)
5. Subete Daijōbu (全て大丈夫)
6. Kuroi Mado (黒い窓)
7. Kioku ni Nokoranai (記憶に残らない)
8. Awa ni Natte (泡になって)
