= Sōten Kōro =

Japanese manga series

- First tankōbon volume cover, featuring Cao Cao

蒼天航路
- Genre: Epic; Historical
- Manga
- Written by: Hagin Yi (1994–1998); King Gonta (1998–2005)
- Illustrated by: King Gonta
- Published by: Kodansha
- Magazine: Morning
- Original run: October 1994 – November 10, 2005
- Volumes: 36
- Anime television series
- Directed by: Toyoo Ashida (chief); Tsuneo Tominaga
- Produced by: Toshio Nakatani; Manabu Tamura
- Written by: Hideo Takayashiki
- Music by: Shūsei Murai
- Studio: Madhouse
- Original network: Nippon TV
- Original run: April 8, 2009 – September 30, 2009
- Episodes: 26
- icon

Sōten Kōro (Japanese: 蒼天航路; lit. 'Blue Sky Route'), also known as Beyond the Heavens, is a Japanese manga series by Hagin Yi and King Gonta. It started in Kodansha's seinen manga magazine Morning in 1994. Following Hagin Yi's death in 1998, King Gonta continued the manga alone, until its conclusion in 2005. Its chapters were collected in thirty-six tankōbon volumes.

A twenty-six episode anime television series adaptation by Madhouse was broadcast on Nippon TV from April to September 2009.

As of February 2017, the manga had over 18 million copies in circulation. In 1998, Sōten Kōro won the 22nd Kodansha Manga Award in the general category.

== Story ==
Sōten Kōro's story is based loosely on the events taking place in Three Kingdoms period of China during the life of the last chancellor of the Eastern Han dynasty, Cao Cao (155 – March 15, 220), who also serves as the main character.

The Three Kingdoms period has been a popular theme in Japanese manga for decades, but Sōten Kōro differs greatly from most of the others on several points. One significant difference is its highly positive portrayal of its main character, Cao Cao, who is traditionally the antagonist in not only Japanese manga, but also most novel versions of the Three Kingdoms period, including the original 14th-century version, Romance of the Three Kingdoms by Luo Guanzhong. Another significant difference from others is that the storyline primarily uses the original historical account of the era, Records of Three Kingdoms by Chen Shou, as a reference rather than the aforementioned Romance of the Three Kingdoms novel. By this, the traditional hero of Romance of the Three Kingdoms, Liu Bei, takes on relatively less importance within the story and is portrayed in a less positive light. Yet, several aspects of the story are in fact based on the novel version, including the employment of its original characters such as Diao Chan, as well as anachronistic weapons such as Guan Yu's Green Dragon Crescent Blade and Zhang Fei's Viper Spear.

A consistent theme throughout the story is Cao Cao's perpetual desire to break China and its people away from its old systems and ways of thinking and initiate a focus on pragmatism over empty ideals. This often puts him at odds with the prevalent customs and notions of Confucianism and those that support them.

== Characters ==
Cao Cao (曹操, Sō Sō)
Voiced by: Mamoru Miyano
Liu Bei (劉備, Ryū Bi)
Voiced by: Tomokazu Seki
Xiahou Dun (夏侯惇, Kakō Ton)
Voiced by: Takeshi Kusao
Xiahou Yuan (夏侯淵, Kakō En)
Voiced by: Tetsu Inada
Cao Ren (曹仁, Sō Jin)
Voiced by: Isshin Chiba
Cao Hong (曹洪, Sō Kō)
Voiced by: Hisao Egawa
Yuan Shao (袁紹, En Shō)
Voiced by: Masaki Terasoma
Guan Yu (関羽, Kan U)
Voiced by: Ken'ichi Morozumi
Zhang Fei (張飛, Chō Hi)
Voiced by: Takaaki Seki
Cao Teng (曹騰, Sō Tō)
Voiced by: Nachi Nozawa
Cao Song (曹嵩, Sō Sū)
Voiced by: Hiroshi Yanaka
Dong Zhuo (董卓, Tō Taku)
Voiced by: Hōchū Ōtsuka
Zhang Rang (張譲, Chō Jō)
Voiced by: Kinryū Arimoto
Emperor Ling of Han (霊帝, Reitei)
Voiced by: Nozomu Sasaki

== Media ==
=== Manga ===
Sōten Kōro was originally written by Hagin Yi and illustrated by King Gonta, starting in Kodansha's seinen manga magazine Morning in 1994 in its 47th issue that year (cover dated November 10, 1994). After Hagin Yi died of liver cancer in 1998, King Gonta continued the story. The series finished in November 10, 2005, in the magazine's 50th issue that year. Kodansha collected its 409 chapters in thirty-six tankōbon volumes, released from October 23, 1995, to January 23, 2006. An eighteen-volume bunkoban edition was published from December 12, 2000, to December 12, 2006. A three-in-one volume edition, consisting of twelve volumes, was published from May 5 to October 23, 2009.

==== Volumes ====
No.	Release date	ISBN
1	October 23, 1995	978-4-06-328434-8
2	October 23, 1995	978-4-06-328435-5
3	January 23, 1996	978-4-06-328447-8
4	April 23, 1996	978-4-06-328461-4
5	September 20, 1996	978-4-06-328482-9
6	January 23, 1997	978-4-06-328495-9
7	April 23, 1997	978-4-06-328510-9
8	June 23, 1997	978-4-06-328518-5
9	August 22, 1997	978-4-06-328534-5
10	November 21, 1997	978-4-06-328548-2
11	January 23, 1998	978-4-06-328555-0
12	April 23, 1998	978-4-06-328570-3
13	July 23, 1998	978-4-06-328586-4
14	October 22, 1998	978-4-06-328602-1
15	January 22, 1999	978-4-06-328613-7
16	May 21, 1999	978-4-06-328629-8
17	September 22, 1999	978-4-06-328646-5
18	December 16, 1999	978-4-06-328664-9
19	March 23, 2000	978-4-06-328679-3
20	June 22, 2000	978-4-06-328695-3
21	December 22, 2000	978-4-06-328716-5
22	April 23, 2001	978-4-06-328745-5
23	September 21, 2001	978-4-06-328766-0
24	December 21, 2001	978-4-06-328794-3
25	June 21, 2002	978-4-06-328822-3
26	October 23, 2002	978-4-06-328846-9
27	March 20, 2003	978-4-06-328878-0
28	July 23, 2003	978-4-06-328894-0
29	October 23, 2003	978-4-06-328908-4
30	February 23, 2004	978-4-06-328930-5
31	May 21, 2004	978-4-06-328955-8
32	August 23, 2004	978-4-06-328978-7
33	February 23, 2005	978-4-06-372414-1
34	July 22, 2005	978-4-06-372456-1
35	January 23, 2006	978-4-06-372481-3
36	January 23, 2006	978-4-06-372494-3

=== Anime ===
An anime television series, animated by Madhouse, was announced in February 2009. The series was broadcast on Nippon TV from April 8 to September 30, 2009. (Note: Nippon TV listed the series' air dates on Tuesday at 24:59, effectively Wednesday at 0:59 a.m. JST.) The opening theme is "909" by Tribal Chair and the ending theme is "Pinhole" (ピンボール, Pinhōru) by Ogre You Asshole.

== Reception ==
In 1998, along with Gambling Apocalypse: Kaiji, Sōten Kōro won the 22nd Kodansha Manga Award in the general category. As of February 2009, the manga had over 10 million copies in circulation. By February 2017, the manga had over 18 million copies in circulation.
