= Your Ghost =

1994 single by Kristin Hersh

Single by Kristin Hersh

from the album Hips and Makers
- B-side: "The Key"; "Uncle June and Aunt Kiyoti"; "When the Levee Breaks"
- Released: January 10, 1994
- Studio: Stable Sound (Portsmouth, Rhode Island)
- Length: 3:16
- Label: Sire (US); 4AD (worldwide)
- Songwriter: Kristin Hersh
- Producers: Lenny Kaye; Kristin Hersh

Kristin Hersh singles chronology
"Your Ghost" (1994)	"A Loon" (1994)

"Your Ghost" is the first track from American singer Kristin Hersh's debut solo studio album, Hips and Makers. The song is about overcoming the death of a close friend and features additional backing vocals from Michael Stipe of R.E.M. Released as a single in January 1994, "Your Ghost" reached number one in Iceland, became a top-30 hit in Belgium and the Netherlands, and reached number 45 on the UK Singles Chart.

== Release and reception ==
The song was released as a single on January 10, 1994. It reached number 45 on the UK Singles Chart. It was voted in at number 41 on Australian radio station Triple J's Hottest 100 for 1994.

Paste named it one of the best 100 songs of the 1990s and said, "you can feel [the] intended intimacy in every second: it sounds like something not meant to be overheard. Everything about it is spectral—the way Hersh's voice trembles at the edges, Jane Scarpantoni's cello curling through it like a draft under a door, the sense that you're eavesdropping on someone alone in an empty house."

== Music video ==
According to Filmmaker magazine, the music video for the song was directed by Katherine Dieckmann and is an homage to Maya Deren's groundbreaking 1943 experimental film Meshes of the Afternoon.

== Track listing ==
- CD single (BAD 4001 CD)
1. "Your Ghost"
2. "The Key"
3. "Uncle June and Aunt Kiyoti"
4. "When the Levee Breaks"

== Charts ==
=== Weekly charts ===
Chart (1994)	Peak position
Belgium (Ultratop 50 Flanders)	25
Iceland (Íslenski Listinn Topp 40)	1
Netherlands (Single Top 100)	27
UK Singles (Official Charts)	45

=== Year-end charts ===
Chart (1994)	Position
Iceland (Íslenski Listinn Topp 40)	36

== Release history ==
Region	Date	Format(s)	Label(s)	Ref.
United Kingdom	January 10, 1994	12-inch vinyl; CD	4AD	
United States	January 11, 1994	Radio	Sire	
