= Sky Motel =

Studio album by Kristin Hersh
- Released: July 20, 1999
- Recorded: December 1998–April 1999
- Genres: Indie rock, folk
- Length: 45:57
- Label: 4AD
- Producer: Trina Shoemaker

Kristin Hersh chronology
Murder, Misery and Then Goodnight (1998)	Sky Motel (1999)	Sunny Border Blue (2001)

Professional ratings
Review scores
Source	Rating
AllMusic	4/5 stars
Entertainment Weekly	A−
NME	4/5 stars
Pitchfork	8.2/10
(The New) Rolling Stone Album Guide	3/5 stars
Spin	8/10

Sky Motel is the fourth studio album by the American musician Kristin Hersh, released in 1999.

== Production ==
Recorded at New Orleans' Kingsway Studio, the album was produced by Trina Shoemaker.

== Critical reception ==
Salon called the album Hersh's "most technically complex, aglow with feedback cascades, pulsing drum loops and sampled nature sounds that suggest a vast, empty night." The Salt Lake Tribune thought that "'A Cleaner Light', 'Echo' and 'Caffeine' are destined to be classics in the Hersh catalog, offering wrenching lyrics that make Jewel or Alanis Morissette's so-called poetry sound like processed, angst-by-numbers in comparison."

== Track listing ==
No.	Title	Length
1.	"Echo"	3:42
2.	"White Trash Moon"	4:29
3.	"Fog"	1:36
4.	"Costa Rica"	3:23
5.	"A Cleaner Light"	4:07
6.	"San Francisco"	2:58
7.	"Cathedral Heat"	5:06
8.	"Husk"	4:28
9.	"Caffeine"	4:25
10.	"Spring"	3:07
11.	"Clay Feet"	5:13
12.	"Faith"	2:27

== Credits ==
Vocals and most of the music are performed by Kristin Hersh. Drums on tracks 1, 5 & 7 are played by Carlo Nuccio who also provides a drum loop for track 8. Drum loops for tracks 3 & 11 are provided by David Narcizo.
