= Gregory and the Hawk =

American singer-songwriter

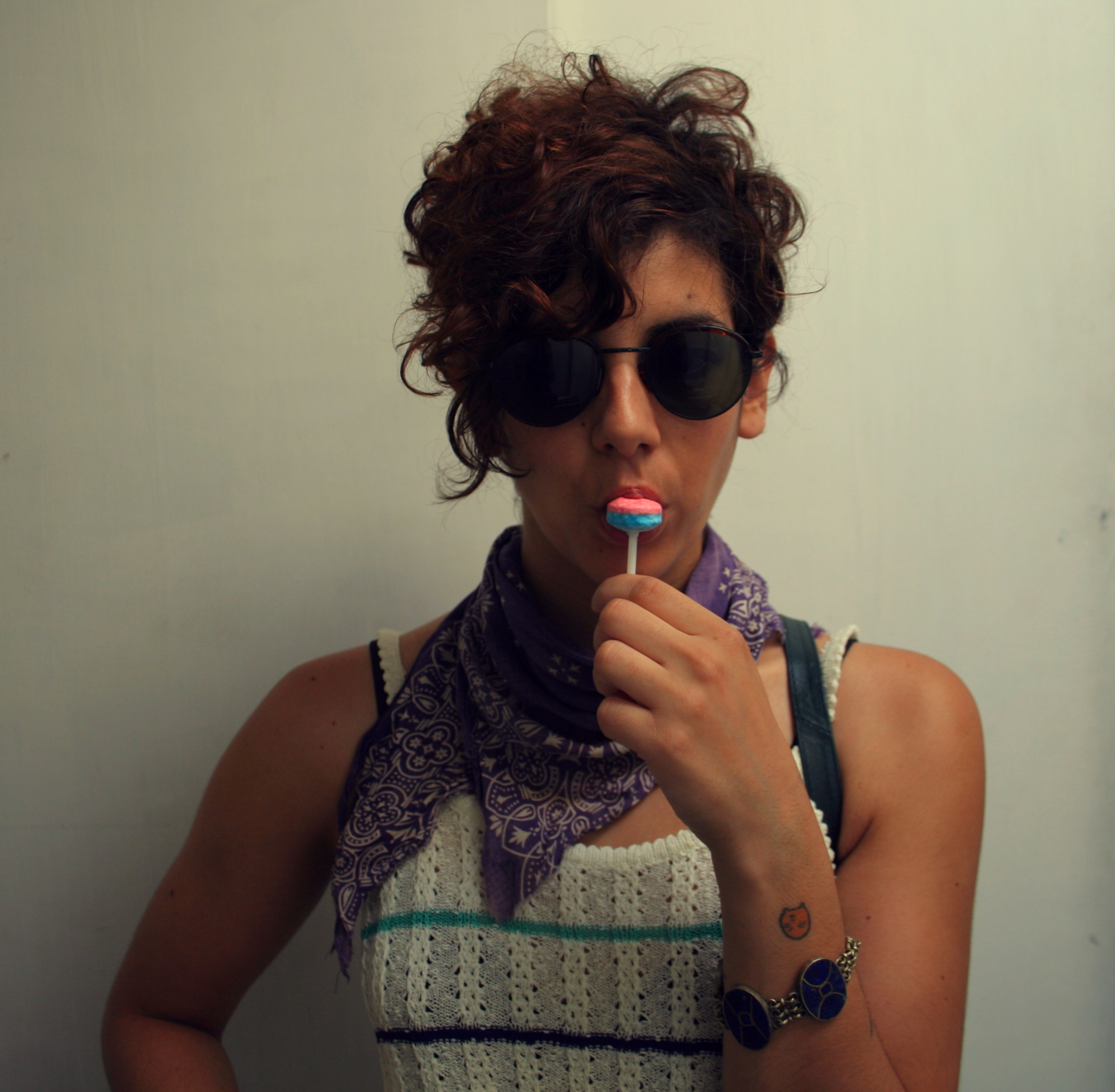
- Meredith Godreau in summer 2007

Background information
- Origin: New York City, United States
- Genres: Acoustic, indie pop, indie folk
- Years active: 2001–present
- Labels: FatCat Records, Pearly Gates!
- Website: https://www.gregoryandthehawk.com/

Meredith Godreau is an American singer-songwriter performing under the pseudonym Gregory and the Hawk, active since 2001.

== Early life ==
Originally from the Boston area, Godreau moved to upstate New York while still in school.

== Career ==
Godreau took on the pseudonym Gregory and the Hawk in 2003, citing her influences as Nick Drake, Liz Phair and PJ Harvey. The name was derived from her brother, Gregory, and his imaginary childhood hawk.

=== Demo EP ===
She released her demo EP, including early versions of "Boats and Birds" and "Isabelle". When asked about going by her real name, Godreau responded, "There is no reason for it. But, I'd walk by places and it'd say 'Playing Tonight – Joe Jones' and I think that was super-boring and I'd never want to go to that show."

Godreau began playing solo shows in small venues around New England until 2005 when she met Mike McGuire in New York. They played live shows together for several months before the bass guitarist Jeff Ratner and drummer Adam Christgau (both of the New York band Paper And Sand) joined the band. The four of them recorded the Boats and Birds EP.

=== Boats and Birds & In Your Dreams ===
In 2006, Gregory and the Hawk self-released the Boats and Birds EP containing the songs "Isabelle" and "Boats and Birds". Mike McGuire (Alger Moy) recorded In Your Dreams, Gregory and the Hawk's first full-length album, in his home studio. The album was self-released in 2007 with Mike McGuire (piano) and Susan Ambrose (flute) as the only other players.

=== FatCat records ===
Godreau played a show at Southpaw in Brooklyn in the summer of 2007, where a representative of Fat Cat Records saw her set. A month later, she was in the studio recording her first FatCat single, "Ghost", and first album, Moenie and Kitchi, which were released in September and October 2008, respectively.

In an interview with AU magazine, Godreau was asked about her work with FatCat Records and responded, "I wasn't really aiming to be on a record label, but now that I am, there have been so many great people that I've met in the last couple of years because of it that I would never, ever say that I wouldn't want to have that. I'm very glad about the people I've met, and not necessarily the technicalities of being on a label."

=== Moenie and Kitchi ===
In the recording of Moenie and Kitchi, many of the instruments were played by the album's producer, Adam Pierce (Mice Parade), with most vocals and guitars recorded simultaneously in just one take. Gregory and the Hawk took a three-continent tour for this album, taking in support slots for múm, The Album Leaf, Mice Parade, Frightened Rabbit, Asian Kung Fu Generation, and other bands.

=== Leche ===
Godreau worked on Leche in winter 2009, writing and self-recording, then taking her music to engineers and collaborators including Pierce, as well as Jeremy Backofen (Felice Brothers) and Rob Laakso (Amazing Baby, Diamond Nights, Mice Parade, Swirlies). The album was released in Canada and the United States on November 9, 2010, and in the UK and Europe on November 15, 2010.

=== Come, Now ===
Godreau's album Come, Now, was released on June 5, 2012. Leading up to the album's release, three songs were posted on her website: "First Flying V" in November 2011, followed by "Cause It's Cold" and "Been Too Long" in January 2012.

=== Stone EP ===
The 6-track Stone EP, was released on November 20, 2012. It contains a heavy use of synthesized sounds, and lyrics about moving across the country.

=== On The Orange Mountain ===
Starting in from August 2016, and going through 2017, Godreau released a collection of new work. The project, titled "On The Orange Mountain" is a series of live recordings captured in the field, from various locations around the Pacific Northwest. Godreau funded the project through the crowdsourcing website Patreon, and has since released the audio recordings digitally.

== Discography ==
=== Albums ===
- Self-titled Demos (2005)
- In Your Dreams (2007)
- Moenie and Kitchi (2008)
- Leche (2010)
- Come, Now (2012)
- On The Orange Mountain (2016–17)
- Texas Collectious (2018–19)
- Quarantunes (2023)

=== EPs ===
- Demo (2004)
- Gregory and the Hawk (Demo) EP (2005)
- Boats and Birds EP (2006)
- Bob: The Album (2009)
- Huckleberry Cherry and Boules EP (2010)
- Stone EP (2012)
- VDay EP (2017)
- Three Weeks No Songs (2020)

=== Singles ===
- "Ghost" (2008)
- "Olly Olly Oxen Free" (2010)
- "Some White Mountain" (2023)
- "Darling" (2025)

=== Compilations ===
- The Lonesome Call of the... WHPRWHIL, Whprwhil Records (2006)
- Pickathon, Pickathon Roots Music Festival (2006)
- Nano-Mugen Compilation 2009, Ki/oon Records (2009)
- We Will Rise Again, Far Cry 5 Presents: Into The Flames (OST), Ubisoft (2018)
