= Sunny Border Blue =

Studio album by Kristin Hersh
- Released: March 12, 2001
- Recorded: April–October 2000
- Studios: Stable Sound, Portsmouth, Rhode Island, USA
- Genres: Indie rock; indie pop
- Length: 51:05
- Label: 4AD
- Producer: Kristin Hersh

Kristin Hersh chronology
Sky Motel (1999)	Sunny Border Blue (2001)	The Grotto (2003)

Sunny Border Blue is the fifth studio album by American singer-songwriter Kristin Hersh. The album peaked at #93 on the Official UK Albums Chart. It also peaked at #50 on the US's Billboard Heatseekers Album Chart and, #33 on the US's Billboard Top Independent Albums chart.

== Critical reception ==
Professional ratings
Aggregate scores
Source	Rating
Metacritic	81/100
Review scores
Source	Rating
AllMusic	4/5 stars
Drowned in Sound	6/10
Entertainment Weekly	(A−)
Pitchfork	7.8/10
Rolling Stone	3.5/5 stars
Tiny Mix Tapes	4/5 stars

Sunny Border Blue was met with "universal acclaim" reviews from critics. At Metacritic, which assigns a weighted average rating out of 100 to reviews from mainstream publications, this release received an average score of 81, based on 15 reviews. Aggregator Album of the Year gave the release a 79 out of 100 based on a critical consensus of 7 reviews.

== Track listings ==
All tracks are written by Kristin Hersh, unless noted.

No.	Title	Writer(s)	Length
1.	"Your Dirty Answer"		5:24
2.	"Spain"		3:54
3.	"37 Hours"		3:26
4.	"Silica"		4:23
5.	"William's Cut"		4:03
6.	"Summer Salt"		4:06
7.	"Trouble"	Cat Stevens	3:25
8.	"Candyland"		4:02
9.	"Measure"		1:09
10.	"White Suckers"		4:25
11.	"Ruby"		4:05
12.	"Flipside"		3:57
13.	"Listerine"		4:46

== Charts ==
Chart performance for Sunny Border Blue
Chart (2001)	Peak position
UK Independent Albums (Official Charts)	12
UK Albums (Official Charts)	93
US Heatseekers Albums (Billboard)	50
US Independent Albums (Billboard)	33
