= Predawn =

Japanese singer-songwriter (born 1986)

- 清水美和子
- Born: June 26, 1986 (age 40); Niigata, Japan
- Occupations: Singer; songwriter
- Musical career
- Genres: Indie folk; Alternative rock; J-pop
- Years active: 2008–present
- Website: predawnmusic.com

Miwako Shimizu (清水美和子, Shimizu Miwako; born June 26, 1986), known professionally as Predawn, is a Japanese singer-songwriter.

Shimizu chose the name "Predawn" as a reference to a collection of fairy tales written by Mimei Ogawa, a fellow native of Niigata Prefecture.

== Career ==
While in middle school, Shimizu won the Tokyo Metropolitan Junior High School Music Composition Competition Prize of Excellence two years in a row.

A member of bands throughout high school and university, she chose to pursue Predawn as a solo project in 2008. She produced, wrote, and recorded her first mini-album, 手のなかの鳥 in 2010, releasing it in June of that year. Since then, she has performed at major music festivals throughout Japan, such as Fuji Rock, Summer Sonic, and Rising Sun Rock Festival. She released her first full-album, A Golden Wheel in March of 2013, followed by Absence in 2016.

== Personal life ==
Shimizu was born in 1986 in Niigata, Japan, and grew up in the suburbs of Tokyo. She studied Philosophy at Shinshu University.

In May of 2022, Shimizu and her husband, former guitar and vocalist for the band andymori Sōhei Oyamada, announced that they were expecting a child together.

== Discography ==
=== Studio albums ===
Title	Release Date
手のなかの鳥	June 2, 2010
A Golden Wheel	March 27, 2013
Absence	September 21, 2016
Calyx EP	January 16, 2019
The Gaze	April 13, 2022
