= Ogre You Asshole =

Japanese rock band

- Origin: Nagano, Japan
- Genres: Indie rock Alternative rock Post punk Psychedelic rock
- Years active: 2001–present
- Labels: VAP 2009–present OYA 2001–present
- Members: Manabu Deto; Kei Mabuchi; Takashi Katsuura; Takashi Shimizu
- Past members: Norihito Hiraide; Arata Nishi
- Website: ogreyouasshole.com

Ogre You Asshole is a Japanese rock band formed in Nagano, taking influences from Modest Mouse, Fugazi, Talking Heads, and Can. They were signed to major label VAP in 2009 and have been praised by the notable guitarist Johnny Marr.

== History ==
Manabu and his elder brother covered Nirvana and Beck songs with original drummer Arata Nishi in the nineties under the name "Joy Division". Manabu's brother left, but he was joined by childhood friend Norihito Hiraide and highschool classmate Kei Mabuchi. Nishi then left for health reasons and was replaced by Takashi Katsuura. They produced their first demo in 2004 and went on to support many notable domestic and international bands including Asian Kung-Fu Generation, Foo Fighters, Art School, The Dresden Dolls and their biggest influence Modest Mouse.

When asked what he attributes their success to, Manabu answered, "I'm not sure. I guess it is because of our name". However, notable fan Johnny Marr said in an interview "I would love to play with Ogre You Asshole. I love 'em. They're not afraid to be poppy. Some guitar bands just don't have the nerve to be poppy and second-guess themselves, you know".

The band was signed to major label VAP in 2009 after releasing their previous work on their independent label OYA. Their major debut single 'Pinhole' was also featured on Nano-Mugen Compilation 2009 and as an ending theme to the anime Sōten Kōro. Their first album on the label 'Foglamp' also included a DVD with the music videos of 'Pinhole' and 'Headlight'.

In 2014 three songs by Ogre You Asshole appeared in the anime Space ☆ Dandy, Bubble of Bubble, White House, and Ferry. Of these, the most popular is フェリー (Ferry).

== Origin of name ==
The name originated when original drummer Arata Nishi saw Modest Mouse bassist Eric Judy on the street near the Hot Lab live house after a gig in Matsumoto during their Japan tour in May 2001. He asked Judy, who was drunk, to name their band. He replied 'I can't' before writing 'Ogre You Asshole' on Nishi's arm.

They were unaware of the exact meaning until American Analog Set told them that the name is actually from a line in the movie Revenge of the Nerds. This resulted in the group setting out to watch the 1984 American comedy and its three sequels, who then paid homage to it with their second album 'AlphaBeta vs. Lambda'.

They shared the tale with Judy in April 2008 when they opened Modest Mouse's show at Tokyo's Duo Music Exchange, but he had no recollection of the encounter.

== Current members ==
- Manabu Deto (出戸 学, Deto Manabu) – vocals, rhythm guitar
- Kei Mabuchi (馬渕 啓, Mabuchi Kei) – lead guitar
- Takashi Katsuura (勝浦 隆嗣, Katsuura Takashi) – drums
- Takashi Shimizu (清水隆史, Shimizu Takashi) – bass

== Former members ==
- Arata Nishi (西 新太, Nishi Arata) – drums

The original drummer of the group, who left for medical reasons, now provides artwork for their CD covers.

- Norihito Hiraide (平出 規人, Hiraide Norihito) – bass

== Discography ==
=== Albums ===
Ogre You Asshole

Studio album by Ogre You Asshole
- Released: 2005
- Genre: Indie rock
- Length: 34:23

Ogre You Asshole chronology
Tanishi (2004)	Ogre You Asshole (2005)	Heikin wa Sayuu Gyaku no Kitai (2006)

Title	Album details	Peak chart positions
Title	Album details	JPN Oricon
Ogre You Asshole	Released: 7 December 2005; Label: OYA	—
Alphabeta vs. Lambda (アルファベータ vs. ラムダ)	Released: 3 October 2007; Label: OYA	134
Foglamp (フォグランプ)	Released: 7 October 2009; Label: OYA, VAP	35
Homely	Released: 24 August 2011; Label: OYA, VAP	45
100-nengo (100年後)	Released: 19 September 2012; Label: OYA, VAP	47
Confidential	Released: 20 February 2013; Label: OYA, VAP	105
Papercraft (ペーパークラフト)	Released: 15 October 2014; Label: OYA, VAP	23
New Kind of Man (新しい人)	Released: 4 September 2019; Label: OYA, VAP	70
"—" denotes a recording that did not chart or was not released in that territory.

==== Ogre You Asshole ====
Ogre You Asshole is the first full-length studio album by Ogre You Asshole. It was released independently on December 7, 2005. Tracks 4 and 7 are taken from their first demo, while track 3 was released before the album as a single.

Track listing

1. Mata Ashita (また明日, Until Tomorrow)
2. Yuurei (ユーレイ, Ghost)
3. Tanishi (タニシ, Pond Snail)
4. Kaisentou (カイセントウ)
5. Kapo (カポ, Capo)
6. Docchika no Kado (どっちかの角, Which Corner)
7. Lobotomy (ロボトミー, Robotomī)
8. J.N

=== EPs ===
Ukareteiru Hito

EP by Ogre You Asshole
- Released: 2010
- Genre: Indie rock

Ogre You Asshole chronology
Foglamp (2009)	Ukareteiru Hito (2010)	homely (2011)

- 1st Demo
- Heikin wa Sayuu Gyaku no Kitai
- Shiranai Aizu Shiraseru Ko
- Ukarete Iru Hito (浮かれている人, Elated People) – released September 1, 2010.

Ukareteiru hito's track listing:

1. Balance (バランス, Baransu)
2. Tankatīra (タンカティーラ)
3. Dochira ni Shiro (どちらにしろ, Which Shall we do)
4. Race no Course (レースのコース, Race Course)
5. Mannaka de (真ん中で, At the True Center)
- Ukareteiru hito twilight edition
- dope

=== Singles ===
- Tanishi
- Pinhole – a song released as a single on March 4, 2009. It was their debut release for a major label after they signed with VAP. The song was included on Asian Kung-Fu Generation's Nano-Mugen Compilation 2009 and was used as the ending theme for the anime Sōten Kōro.

Pinhole's track listing:

1. Pinhole (ピンホール, Pinhōru)
2. Necktie (ネクタイ, Nekutai)
3. Boat (ボート, Bōto)
