= Possible Dust Clouds =

Studio album by Kristin Hersh
- Released: October 5, 2018
- Recorded: May 2017 – July 2018
- Studios: Stable Sound Studio, Portsmouth, Rhode Island; Studio Paradiso, San Francisco, California
- Genres: Alternative rock; indie rock
- Length: 36:20
- Label: Fire
- Producers: Kristin Hersh; Steve Rizzo

Kristin Hersh chronology
Wyatt at the Coyote Palace (2016)	Possible Dust Clouds (2018)	Clear Pond Road (2023)

Singles from Possible Dust Clouds
- 1. "No Shade in Shadow" Released: July 24, 2018

Professional ratings
Aggregate scores
Source	Rating
Metacritic	78/100
Review scores
Source	Rating
AllMusic	4/5 stars
Drowned in Sound	8/10
MusicOMH	4/5 stars

Possible Dust Clouds is the tenth studio album by American musician Kristin Hersh. It was released on October 5, 2018 under Fire Records.

== Release ==
On July 24, 2018, Hersh announced the release of her tenth studio album, along with the first single "No Shade in Shadow".

== Critical reception ==
Possible Dust Clouds was met with "generally favorable" reviews from critics. At Metacritic, which assigns a weighted average rating out of 100 to reviews from mainstream publications, this release received an average score of 78, based on 9 reviews. Aggregator Album of the Year gave the release a 82 out of 100 based on a critical consensus of 5 reviews.

=== Accolades ===
Accolades for Possible Dust Clouds
Publication	Accolade	Rank
MusicOMH	MusicOMH's Top 50 Albums of 2018	26

== Track listing ==
Possible Dust Clouds track listing
No.	Title	Length
1.	"LAX"	3:49
2.	"No Shade in Shadow"	3:34
3.	"Halfway Home"	3:57
4.	"Fox Point"	3:12
5.	"Lethe"	3:49
6.	"Loudmouth"	3:32
7.	"Gin"	2:46
8.	"Tulum"	3:44
9.	"Breathe In"	3:20
10.	"Lady Godiva"	4:37

== Personnel ==
Musicians

- Kristin Hersh – primary artist, bass, producer
- David Narcizo – drums
- Fred Abong – bass
- Rob Ahlers – drums, engineer
- Christopher E. Brady – bass, backing vocals
- Wyatt True – drums

Production

- Steve Rizzo – mastering, mixer, producer
