= Wyatt at the Coyote Palace =

Studio album by Kristin Hersh
- Released: November 11, 2016
- Recorded: April–August 2016
- Studios: Stable Sound Studios, Portsmouth, Rhode Island
- Genre: Rock
- Length: 1:22:16
- Label: Omnibus Press
- Producer: Kristin Hersh

Kristin Hersh chronology
Crooked (2010)	Wyatt at the Coyote Palace (2016)	Possible Dust Clouds (2018)

Professional ratings
Aggregate scores
Source	Rating
AnyDecentMusic?	7.2/10
Metacritic	80/100
Review scores
Source	Rating
AllMusic	3.5/5 stars
Classic Rock	3.5/5 stars
Drowned in Sound	9/10
MusicOMH	3.5/5 stars
Pitchfork	7.5/10

Wyatt at the Coyote Palace is the ninth studio album by American musician Kristin Hersh. It was released on November 11, 2016 in the form of a book and album, through Omnibus Press.

== Critical reception ==
Wyatt at the Coyote Palace was met with "generally favorable" reviews from critics. At Metacritic, which assigns a weighted average rating out of 100 to reviews from mainstream publications, this release received an average score of 80, based on 10 reviews. Aggregator Album of the Year gave the release a 76 out of 100 based on a critical consensus of 6 reviews.

== Track listing ==
Disc One
No.	Title	Length
1.	"Bright"	3:37
2.	"Bubble Net"	4:30
3.	"In Stitches"	4:28
4.	"Secret Codes"	3:25
5.	"Green Screen"	3:20
6.	"Hemingway's Tell"	3:50
7.	"Detox"	3:22
8.	"Wonderland"	3:01
9.	"Day 3"	3:06
10.	"Diving Bell"	3:20
11.	"Killing Two Birds"	3:20
12.	"Guadalupe"	4:01

Disc Two
No.	Title	Length
1.	"American Copper"	2:42
2.	"August"	2:11
3.	"Some Dumb Runaway"	3:57
4.	"Sun Blown"	2:14
5.	"From the Plane"	2:21
6.	"Elysian Fields"	4:27
7.	"Soma Gone Slapstick"	2:53
8.	"Cooties"	2:14
9.	"Christmas Underground"	3:39
10.	"Between Piety and Desire"	2:55
11.	"Shaky Blue Can"	3:16
12.	"Shotgun"	6:07

Although the album's booklet reverses the first two tracks of Disc 2, the tracklist of the actual media is as above.
