= Clear Pond Road =

Studio album by Kristin Hersh
- Released: September 8, 2023
- Length: 37:20
- Label: Fire
- Producer: Kristin Hersh; Steve Rizzo

Kristin Hersh chronology
Possible Dust Clouds (2018)	Clear Pond Road (2023)	Sugar on Blackstone (2026)

Clear Pond Road is the eleventh studio album by American musician Kristin Hersh, released through Fire Records on September 8, 2023.

== Critical reception ==
Professional ratings
Aggregate scores
Source	Rating
Metacritic	77/100
Review scores
Source	Rating
Mojo	3/5 stars
Slant Magazine	4/5 stars
Uncut	8/10
The Wire	4/5 stars

Clear Pond Road received a score of 77 out of 100 on review aggregator Metacritic based on four critics' reviews, indicating "generally favorable" reception. Uncut called it "deliciously dark and yet full of an elegant lightness, this is Hersh at the top of her considerable game", while Mojo described it as "hard-won optimism, as ever, from this troubled heroine". The Wire stated that Hersh has "done it again but, as ever, differently". Steve Erickson of Slant Magazine felt that Hersh has "successfully carved out her own lane, maintaining a touch of the Muses's jaggedness while largely eschewing electric instrumentation" as "the album's production embraces the inherently rough edges of Hersh's songs", which he wrote "feel intensely personal but opaque".

== Track listing ==
All tracks are written by Kristin Hersh.

Clear Pond Road track listing
No.	Title	Length
1.	"Bewitched Reruns"	3:53
2.	"Ms Haha"	3:33
3.	"Dandelion"	3:37
4.	"Constance Street"	2:54
5.	"Thank You, Corner Blight"	4:11
6.	"St. Valentine's Day Massacre"	3:31
7.	"Reflections on the Motive Power of Fire"	3:37
8.	"Eyeshine"	5:05
9.	"Palmetto"	3:10
10.	"Tunnels"	3:49
Total length:		37:20

== Personnel ==
- Kristin Hersh – lead vocals, production, photography
- Steve Rizzo – production, mastering, mixing, engineering

== Charts ==
Chart performance for Clear Pond Road
Chart (2023)	Peak position
Scottish Albums (OCC)	37
UK Album Downloads (OCC)	18
UK Independent Albums (OCC)	14
