= The Grotto (album) =

Studio album by Kristin Hersh
- Released: March 17, 2003
- Recorded: June–December 2002
- Genres: Indie rock, folk
- Length: 49:29
- Label: 4AD
- Producer: Kristin Hersh

Kristin Hersh chronology
Sunny Border Blue (2001)	The Grotto (2003)	Learn to Sing Like a Star (2007)

The Grotto is the sixth solo album released by Kristin Hersh. It was released on 17 March 2003 on 4AD records, simultaneously with the self-titled album from Hersh's band, Throwing Muses. It features Howe Gelb on piano and Andrew Bird on violin. Kristin Hersh produced the album as well as playing all other instruments. The album peaked at #39 on the US's Billboard Top Independent Albums Chart.

== Critical reception ==
Professional ratings
Aggregate scores
Source	Rating
Metacritic	75/100
Review scores
Source	Rating
AllMusic	3/5 stars
Entertainment Weekly	A−
The Guardian	4/5 stars
Pitchfork	8/10

The Grotto was met with "generally favorable" reviews from critics. At Metacritic, which assigns a weighted average rating out of 100 to reviews from mainstream publications, this release received an average score of 75, based on 14 reviews. Aggregator Album of the Year gave the release a 74 out of 100 based on a critical consensus of 5 reviews.

== Track listing ==
All tracks are written by Kristin Hersh.

No.	Title	Length
1.	"Sno Cat"	3:37
2.	"Deep Wilson"	4:18
3.	"Snake Oil"	3:53
4.	"Vanishing Twin"	3:35
5.	"SRB"	4:50
6.	"Silver Sun"	5:32
7.	"Vitamins V"	6:32
8.	"Arnica Montana"	5:36
9.	"Milk Street"	5:56
10.	"Ether"	5:41
