= Murder, Misery and Then Goodnight =

Studio album by Kristin Hersh
- Released: October 26, 1998
- Recorded: March–July 1998
- Genre: Folk
- Length: 31:19
- Label: 4AD
- Producer: Kristin Hersh, Billy O'Connell, Steve Rizzo

Kristin Hersh chronology
Strange Angels (1998)	Murder, Misery and Then Goodnight (1998)	Sky Motel (1999)

Professional ratings
Review scores
Source	Rating
AllMusic	4/5 stars
NME	2.5/5 stars

Murder, Misery and Then Goodnight is Kristin Hersh's third solo album and quite a departure from her other solo recordings, in that it contains solely Appalachian folk songs about murder and death arranged by Kristin Hersh, rather than songs written by Hersh herself. Hersh's son, Ryder James O'Connell, plays piano and sings backing vocals.

The album was produced by Kristin Hersh, co-produced by Steve Rizzo and Billy O'Connell, and engineered by Steve Rizzo.

== Track listing ==
No.	Title	Writer(s)	Length
1.	"Down in the Willow Garden"	Charlie Monroe	4:53
2.	"I Never Will Marry"	A. P. Carter	2:30
3.	"Sweet Roseanne"		3:02
4.	"Poor Ellen Smith"	Molly Davis; Lynn Davis	2:10
5.	"Pretty Polly"		2:05
6.	"Little Birdy"		2:13
7.	"Mama’s Gonna Buy"		2:19
8.	"Fly Around My Blue Eyed Girl"		1:21
9.	"Banks of the Ohio"		3:36
10.	"Three Nights Drunk"		2:00
11.	"What’ll We Do With The Baby-o"		2:19
12.	"Whole Heap Of Little Horses"		2:48
