= Strange Angels (Kristin Hersh album) =

Studio album by Kristin Hersh
- Released: February 2, 1998
- Recorded: July–November 1997
- Genre: Indie rock, folk
- Length: 45:43
- Label: 4AD
- Producer: Kristin Hersh, Joe Henry, Steve Rizzo

Kristin Hersh chronology
Hips and Makers (1994)	Strange Angels (1998)	Murder, Misery and Then Goodnight (1998)

Hersh in conversation in 1998

Strange Angels is the second studio album by American musician Kristin Hersh. It was released on February 2, 1998 in Europe by 4AD, and elsewhere by Rykodisc. The album was produced by Hersh and co-produced by Joe Henry (except for "Like You", which was co-produced by Steve Rizzo).

Strange Angels peaked at number 64 on the UK Albums Chart and number 40 on the US Billboard Heatseekers Albums chart. The album carried the dedication: "for Billy, Dylan, Ryder, Wyatt and TM (1984–1997)".

== Critical reception ==
Professional ratings
Review scores
Source	Rating
AllMusic	3/5 stars
Chicago Tribune	3.5/4 stars
Entertainment Weekly	A−
The Guardian	2/5 stars
NME	4/10
Pitchfork	6.1/10
Rolling Stone	3.5/5 stars
Select	3/5
Spin	6/10
Vox	4/5 stars

In Entertainment Weekly, Will Hermes praised Strange Angels as among Hersh's "strongest music ever" and credited her for "transforming common trials of home and heart into moments of surreal transcendence." Chicago Tribune critic Rick Reger called it "a beautiful, contemplative LP that's anything but placid", finding that "the contrast between her striking imagery and the record's pristine ambience only heightens the intensity of her songs." AllMusic's Stephen Thomas Erlewine was less enthusiastic, deeming Strange Angels "a strong collection of songs" needing "a more varied production to make the record more compelling." Caroline Sullivan of The Guardian concluded that "the lyrics are jumbled and opaque, and this, along with Hersh's tuneless plinking and quavering voice, makes Strange Angels either heaven or hell."

== Track listing ==
All tracks are written by Kristin Hersh, unless noted.

Strange Angels track listing
No.	Title	Length
1.	"Home"	3:13
2.	"Like You"	3:23
3.	"Aching for You"	3:49
4.	"Cold Water Coming"	2:42
5.	"Some Catch Flies"	3:27
6.	"Stained"	3:20
7.	"Shake"	2:33
8.	"Hope"	3:28
9.	"Pale"	1:49
10.	"Baseball Field"	3:16
11.	"Heaven"	2:27
12.	"Gazebo Tree"	3:38
13.	"Gut Pageant"	3:26
14.	"Rock Candy Brains"	3:50
15.	"Cartoons"	1:20

== Personnel ==
- Ivo Watts-Russell – executive producer
- Shinro Ohtake – artwork
- Vaughan Oliver – design
- John Patrick Salisbury – photography

== Charts ==
Chart (1998)	Peak position
UK Albums (OCC)	64
UK Independent Albums (OCC)	7
US Heatseekers Albums (Billboard)	40
