= Learn to Sing Like a Star =

Studio album by Kristin Hersh
- Released: January 23, 2007
- Recorded: June–October 2006
- Studios: Stable Sound Studio, Portsmouth, Rhode Island
- Genre: Indie rock
- Length: 41:20
- Labels: 4AD, Yep Roc Records
- Producer: Kristin Hersh

Kristin Hersh chronology
The Grotto (2003)	Learn to Sing Like a Star (2007)	Cats and Mice (2010)

Professional ratings
Aggregate scores
Source	Rating
Metacritic	74/100
Review scores
Source	Rating
Allmusic	4.5/5 stars
The Austin Chronicle	3.5/5 stars
MusicOMH	4/5 stars
Pitchfork	6.2/10
Rolling Stone	3/5 stars
Slant Magazine	4/5 stars

Learn to Sing Like a Star is Kristin Hersh's seventh solo album and was released in the US on Yep Roc Records on the 23 January 2007 and on 4AD for the rest of the world on the 29 January. The album was produced by Kristin herself and mixed in Nashville by two-time Grammy winner Trina Shoemaker. It features her Throwing Muses bandmate David Narcizo on drums and with strings by the McCarricks. The album peaked at No. 27 on the US's Billboard Top Heatseekers Album Chart.

== Touring ==
In early 2007 Hersh toured throughout Europe and the US to promote the album, first solo in a series of instore performances and then with her 50 Foot Wave bandmates Bernard Georges and Rob Ahlers as well as The McCarricks.

== Critical reception ==
Learn to Sing Like a Star was met with "generally favorable reviews from critics. At Metacritic, which assigns a weighted average rating out of 100 to reviews from mainstream publications, this release received an average score of 74, based on 20 reviews. Aggregator Album of the Year gave the release a 75 out of 100 based on a critical consensus of nine reviews.

Shawn Badgley of The Austin Chronicle said the album "is the full Hersh experience, encompassing as it does all of her back-catalog iterations, from the knife-throwing thrills of the Throwing Muses' precise power pop to the cutting melancholia of her Hips and Makers-era balladry. With help from Dave Narcizo on drums and Martin and Kimberlee McCarrick on cello and violin, Hersh handles everything else."

== Track listing ==
All tracks are written by Kristin Hersh.

No.	Title	Length
1.	"In Shock"	4:12
2.	"Nerve Endings"	3:35
3.	"Day Glow"	3:56
4.	"Christian Hearse"	0:29
5.	"Ice"	3:16
6.	"Under the Gun"	3:10
7.	"Piano 1"	1:43
8.	"Sugarbaby"	3:10
9.	"Peggy Lee"	3:15
10.	"Piano 2"	0:47
11.	"Vertigo"	3:59
12.	"Winter"	2:33
13.	"Wild Vanilla"	2:58
14.	"The Thin Man"	4:17

== Personnel ==
Musicians

- Kristin Hersh – primary artist, producer
- Kimberlee McCarrick – violin
- David Narcizo – drums
- Martin McCarrick – cello

Production

- Joe Gastwirt – engineer
- Steve Rizzo – engineer
- Mike Paragone – mixing
