= The Young Punx =

English electronic dance music group

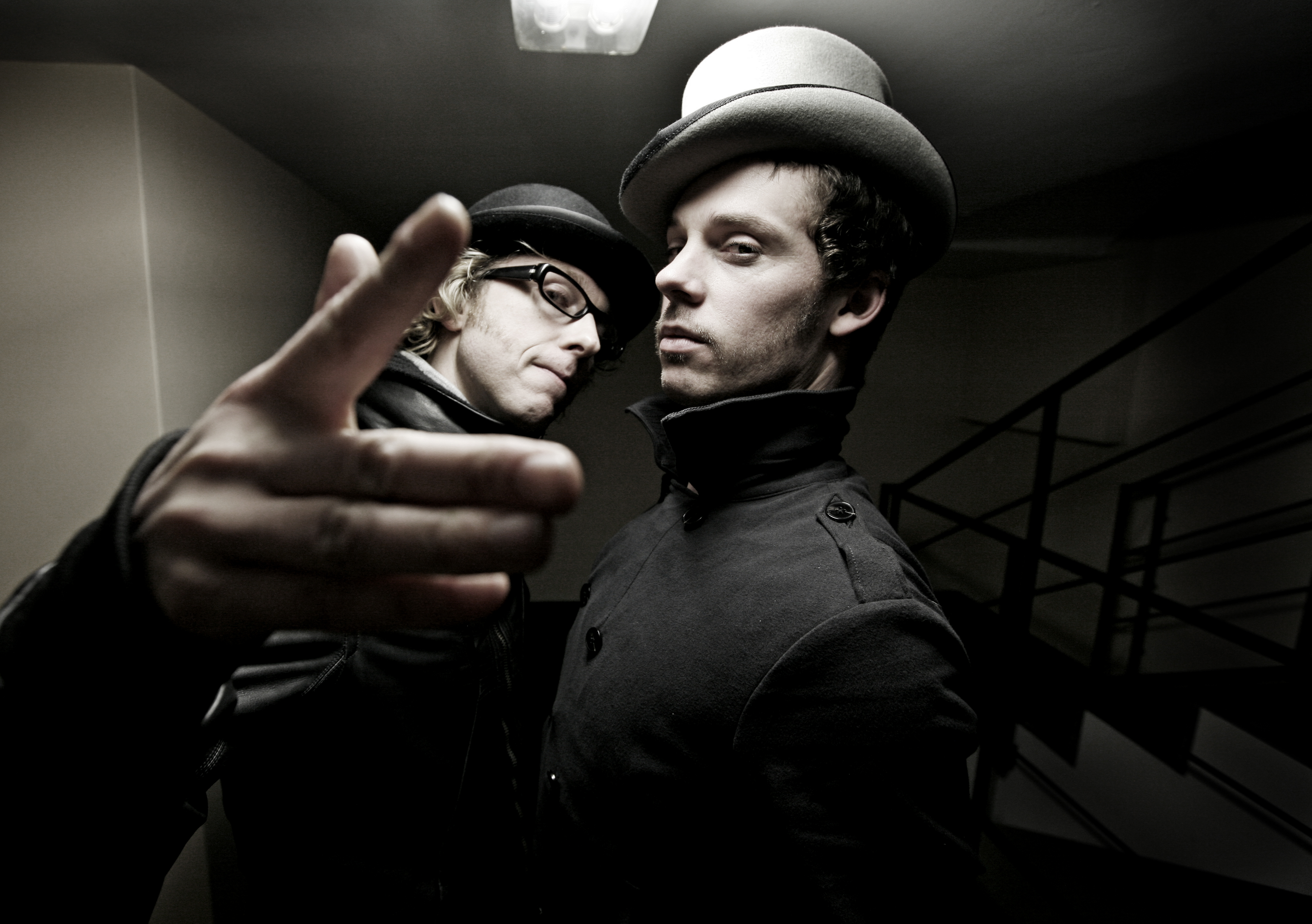

Background information
- Origin: London, England
- Genres: Electronic, house, nu-disco, big beat, alternative hip hop
- Years active: 2003–present
- Labels: MofoHifi, Avex, Ultra Records
- Members: Hal Ritson; Cameron Saunders; Nathan Taylor; Simon Bettison
- Website: https://www.theyoungpunx.com

The Young Punx are an English electronic dance music group whose eclectic and energetic style encompasses French house, breakbeat and drum and bass, mashed up with elements as diverse as 1980s pop, rock, disco and jazz.

The Young Punx's music is created by producer, multi-instrumentalist and singer Hal Ritson in collaboration with an eclectic collective of guest musicians, producers and singers including Italian electro producer Phonat, virtuoso guitarist Guthrie Govan, co-founder of the act Cameron Saunders (formerly of New Atlantic), DJ Nathan Taylor and vocalists such as Yola of Massive Attack, Count Bass D, Amanda Palmer and Laura Kidd.

== Career ==
=== Bootlegs, mash-ups and white labels ===
They initially came to prominence in 2003/2004 after releasing a string of white label bootleg dance records which drew attention by sampling unlikely source material such as '80s Madonna tracks (foreshadowing the trend for '80s pop sampling records in the following years), Heavy metal such as Motörhead's "The Ace of Spades" and pop culture trends such as The Matrix films. "Got Your Number" – their tongue-in-cheek disco house bootleg of the iconic 118 118 TV adverts featuring music sampled from the Rocky theme gained widespread attention in late 2003 after BBC Radio 1 DJ Judge Jules played an mp3 of it on his show. Despite having only been created as a joke, the track became a UK clubland phenomenon. It was put at 25–1 odds to be Christmas Number One by William Hill bookmakers, featured in The Sun newspaper, signed to EMI and entered the UK Club Chart Top 10. However the full commercial release of the record was ultimately cancelled due to legal wrangles.

In 2005, the Young Punx produced a satirical remake of Mylo's "Destroy Rock & Roll" entitled "Destroy Celebrity Crap" which replaced the original's list of 1980s pop stars with a list of the main celebrities who were currently dominating the UK media in a lighthearted backlash against the dumbing down celebrity focus of the media. Distributed for free on mp3, the track received in excess of 20,000 downloads within one week after exposure in Popbitch newsletter.

=== Remixes ===
Building on their reputation as bootleg remixers, which led to them being voted number 2 bootleg remixers of 2003 by listeners of BBC Radio One, The Young Punx have increasingly become one of the most in-demand remix artists in the UK. Some of their most well known mixes include "Hideaway" by De'lacy, "Stoned in Love" by Chicane and Tom Jones, "Come on get it on" by Studio B, "I like girls" by Hound Dogs and "Rocket (a natural gambler)" by Braund Reynolds along with tracks by the Scissor Sisters, Don Diablo, Ike & Tina Turner, The Similou, Krafty Kuts, Space Cowboy and Norman Cook's "Mighty Dub Katz". With a very strong following in Japan, in 2008, The Young Punx remixed Step You, a #1-song by Japanese superstar Ayumi Hamasaki.

=== Original material ===
The Young Punx have released a number of original tracks commercially on vinyl, CD and mp3. 2005's "Young and Beautiful" was described by Fatboy Slim as "the most insane/catchy song I have heard all year". 2006's "Rockall" continued their trend for incorporating elements of popular culture into their work through sampling and re-editing the Shipping Forecast as read by BBC Radio 4 announcer Alan Smith.

In February 2007, their track "You've Got To..." became the most podcasted track in the world (as measured by the Podmusiccountdown.com chart for that week) when they released it onto the podsafe music network. It featured as one of the songs on FIFA 07.

The Young Punx's track "Ready for the Fight" is also featured in the demo and final release of EA Sports Fight Night Round 4, a boxing videogame on the PlayStation 3 and Xbox 360.

Their debut album Your Music Is Killing Me was released in 2007/2008, features in EA Sports game UEFA Euro 2008.. Their second album, entitled Mashpop And Punkstep was released in March 2010 and was co-produced by Phonat with guest appearances from Count Bass D.

In January 2011, their collaboration with Amanda Palmer "Map of Tasmania" received a quarter of a million video hits in one week.

=== Live performances ===
In addition to performing as a DJ duo (including supporting Tiësto at the world's largest club, Privilege Ibiza), The Young Punx perform as a live band including renowned guitarist Guthrie Govan. They have performed at major international festivals including Glastonbury Festival (2007), Summer Sonic Festival (2007), Nano Mugen Festival (2008) and Blue Balls Festival (2008). In 2006, they performed at the Nano Mugen Festival in Japan to 24,000 people.

=== TV and radio presenting ===
Hal Ritson, Simon Bettison and Nathan Taylor of The Young Punx also present shows in the media under The Young Punx brand. They hosted 2 seasons of the Japanese version of So You Think You Can Dance, have presented several specials on UK Dance music TV station Flaunt, and since 2007 have hosted a dance music and entertainment Podcast – "The Young Punx FM".

=== Collaboration with Dizzee Rascal ===
In 2009, Ritson and Govan of the Young Punx worked on four tracks on Dizzee Rascal's album Tongue N Cheek, leading to The Young Punx becoming Dizzee's backing band for several full live gigs, notably the 2009 BBC Electric Proms and Glastonbury Festival 2010.

=== Working relationship with Han Hoogerbrugge ===
The Young Punx have developed an artistic partnership with Dutch digital artist Han Hoogerbrugge in which Hoogerbrugge has developed the visual identity for the band, record artwork and a number of animated videos. Built on a darkly comic cast of surreal hand drawn characters, later animated in flash and 3-D animated packages, Hoogerbrugge's distinctive creations act both as the main public identity for the band, and as an exhibited part of Hoogerbrugge's own portfolio.

== Discography ==
- Your Music Is Killing Me
- Mashpop and Punkstep
- All These Things Are Gone
- Hollywood Kiss
