= Kristin Hersh =

American musician (born 1966)

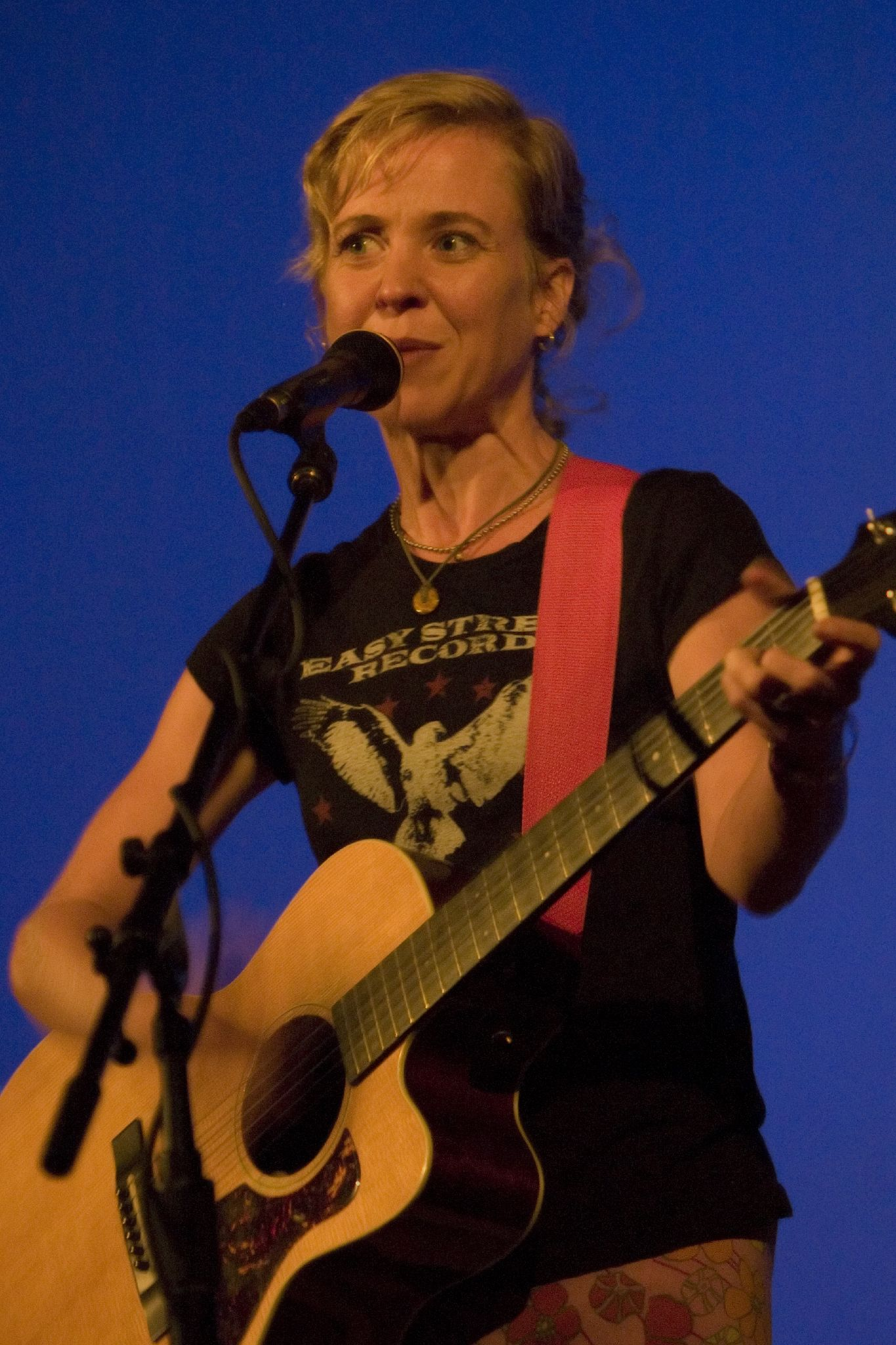
- Hersh performing at the Brattle Theatre in Cambridge, Massachusetts, 2007

Background information
- Born: Martha Kristin Hersh; August 7, 1966 (age 60); Atlanta, Georgia, U.S.
- Genres: Alternative rock; folk; pop
- Occupations: Singer; musician; songwriter
- Instruments: Guitar; vocals
- Years active: 1981–present
- Labels: 4AD; Throwing Music; Sire; Reprise; Warner Bros.; Fire Records (UK)
- Website: kristinhersh.com

Martha Kristin Hersh (born August 7, 1966) is an American singer, guitarist, and songwriter known for her solo work and with her rock bands Throwing Muses and 50FootWave. She has released eleven solo albums. Her guitar work and composition style ranges from jaggedly dissonant to traditional folk. Hersh's lyrics have a stream-of-consciousness style, reflecting her personal experiences.

== Early life ==
Hersh was born in Atlanta. She moved to Newport, Rhode Island with her family, when she was six years old. Her father was a professor at Salve Regina University and her mother was a special educational needs teacher. Kristin was interested in music at an early age; her father gave her a guitar when she was nine. Kristin's parents separated when Hersh was 11, and her mother married the father of her best friend Tanya Donelly. Hersh talked Donelly into starting a band, then called The Muses, when they were 14.

== Musical career ==
=== Throwing Muses and early solo work ===
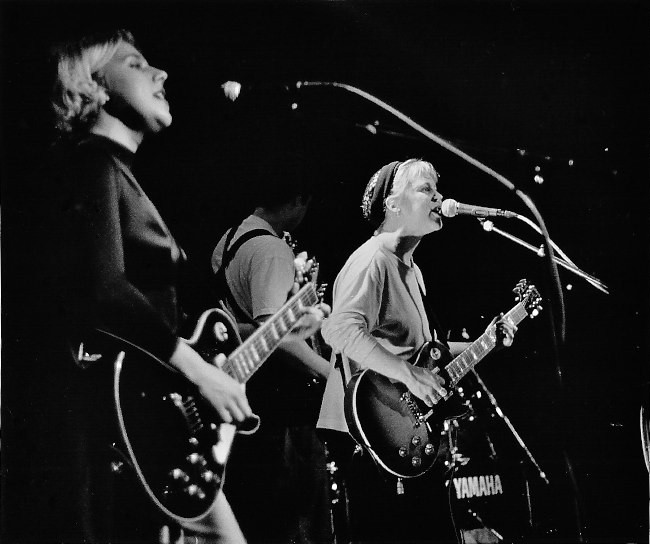
Throwing Muses: Tanya Donelly, Fred Abong, Hersh in Glasgow, March 1991

Throwing Muses was formed in 1981 when Hersh and Donelly were freshmen in high school. Friends from school, including Elaine Adamedes, Becca Blumen, Leslie Langston and David Narcizo, were part of the group with Narcizo (and in the beginning, Langston) becoming a long-term member. Hersh initially wrote and sang most of Throwing Muses' songs, often in changing tempos. Donelly contributed songs and lead vocals.

Hersh attended Salve Regina University in Newport, majoring in archetypal psychology and philosophy, but dropped out shortly before graduating to establish the band in Boston where they had been playing on weekends. While at Salve Regina, Hersh befriended film actress Betty Hutton, who was attending the school in her 60s; Hutton also attended several early Throwing Muses shows in Newport. The Throwing Muses were signed to 4AD, the first American group to be signed on the British label, and released the EP Chains Changed in 1987. Two releases followed, the mini-LP The Fat Skier and the album House Tornado. The 4AD Throwing Muses biography describes its sound at the time as "joining the dots between elliptical post-punk, harmonious folk jangle and rockabilly thunder without ever settling into standard genre patterns." For the Throwing Muses 1986 UK tour, the Boston-based Pixies, embarking on their first European tour, was the opening band.

The band signed a U.S. deal with Sire/Reprise Records in 1987 and began touring the U.S. and Europe while recording albums, with Hersh writing most of the songs. The band became a trio when Donelly left the group after 1991's The Real Ramona. In 1994, Hersh began a solo career on Sire/Reprise and 4AD as an acoustic performer, beginning with Hips and Makers, an album sparsely arranged around her vocals, guitar, and a cellist, in contrast to the volatile, electric sound of her band work. Michael Stipe of R.E.M. made an appearance on this first solo album. After receiving some airplay and major media coverage for the Throwing Muses album University in 1995, Hersh moved to Rykodisc for the band's 1996 album, Limbo, and released her solo album, Strange Angels, in 1998.

Hersh in conversation in 1998

To better control her career and the distribution of her recorded material, she created the ThrowingMusic label with then-husband and manager Billy O'Connell in 1996. That enabled her to co-release some of her projects, including an ongoing download-subscription service called Works in Progress (WIP) for releases available through the label's website. Hersh continued to offer her solo releases online, releasing Sky Motel in 1999. Throwing Muses functions as a noncommercial musical enterprise, focusing on touring over record sales and airplay. In a 2014 interview, Hersh said, "As far as I'm concerned, music is not a commodity. It's something that people have earned by being human. They have a right to hear it, and a right to share it, as they always have in churches and parties. That's how music happens."

=== 2000 to present ===
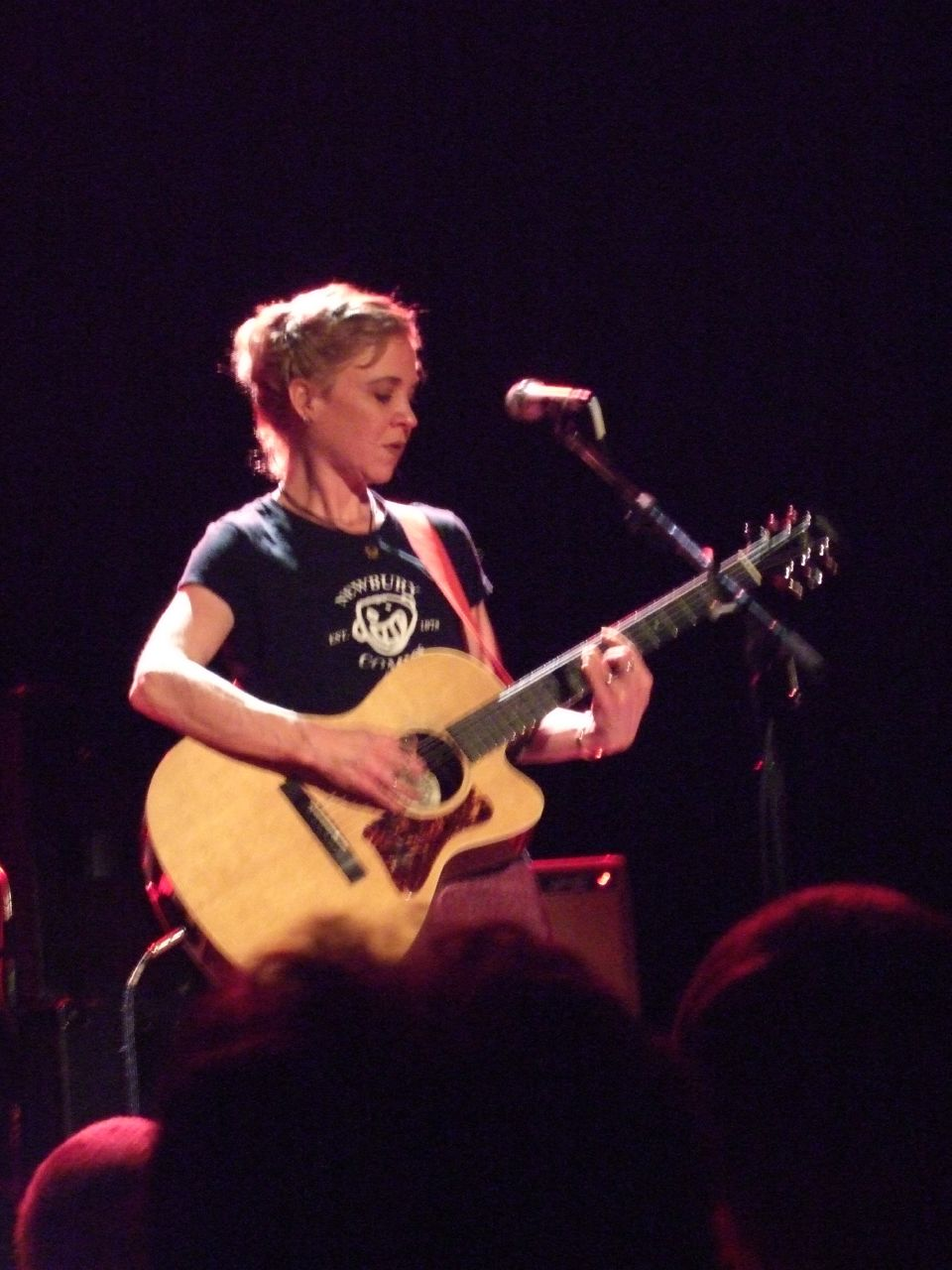
Hersh at the Bowery Ballroom in Manhattan, New York, April 2007

In 2001, Hersh released the Sunny Border Blue solo album, on which she again played nearly all instruments. She described the album as having even more intensity than her previous works, as she continued her pursuit of songwriting as being in part a way to transform "ugly feelings" into art. She also collaborated further with like-minded alternative artists like Vic Chesnutt, Willard Grant Conspiracy, Grant-Lee Phillips, and John Doe. In 2003, she released The Grotto, an acoustic solo album of song sketches with personal lyrics set in Providence, Rhode Island, with Andrew Bird on violin and Howe Gelb on piano. On the same date a self-titled album by Throwing Muses was also released, the first since Limbo. Both were recorded at Steve Rizzo's studio in Rhode Island. When Narcizo was unable to tour on a full-time basis due to other commitments, Hersh formed her power rock trio 50FootWave. Her touring appearances and recording efforts in 2004 and 2005 centered around both 50 Foot Wave and her solo career.

==== Independent output ====
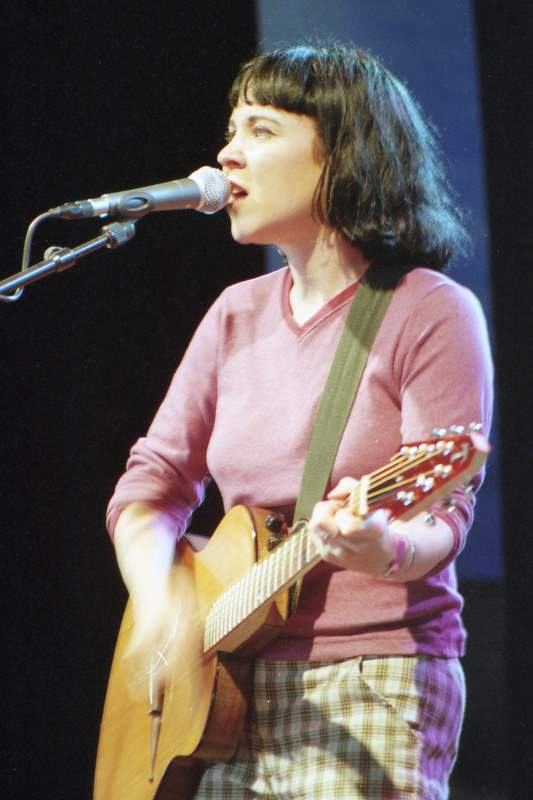
Hersh at the Roskilde Festival in 1998

In 2007, Hersh released her first solo album in four years, entitled Learn to Sing Like a Star. NPR described Hersh's "emotional and raw" pop songs as both "accessible and off-kilter." Concurrently she launched CASH Music, a subscription-based, direct-to-consumer website, that was formed along with fellow musician Donita Sparks. Fans can become "Strange Angels" and subscribe to her output to receive albums and print releases, downloadable content, and guest spots for live shows–packages ranging from $30 per quarter to $5,000 (executive producer credit on her next album) 50FootWave's EP Power+Light was released on CASH in 2009 and Hersh was involved in several projects—a second collection of Appalachian folksongs, The Shady Circle and a series of new free tracks. The album Crooked was released as a downloadable album and hardback book containing essays about each track.

Throwing Muses reformed in 2013 and released Purgatory/Paradise, a 32-track album accompanied by a book designed by Narcizo, who works as a graphic designer. The book features photos, artwork and lyrics by Hersh. It was the band's first release in ten years.

At that point in her career, Hersh's output was independently released online. She expressed that she wanted a complete break with the music industry, stating, "Because we differ from the recording industry ethically, we had been asked to dumb down our product so many times. I have been asked to act and look like a bimbo so many times and I just decided, 'I'm not going to turn my back on my music. I'm not going to turn my back on women.' We're morally bound to not participate in the traditional recording industry because we disagree with it. So we continue to play music, which has nothing to do with the music business." In October 2016, she released the double album Wyatt at the Coyote Place and an accompanying book. Hersh embarked on a tour in support of the album. On June 12, 2018, Hersh announced on her website that she has signed with Fire Records. Her new record, Possible Dust Clouds, was released on October 5, 2018. She finished recording the album in May of the same year. In February 2020, it was announced that Throwing Muses would release a new album, Sun Racket, on May 22; the release was delayed to September 4.

== Themes and style ==
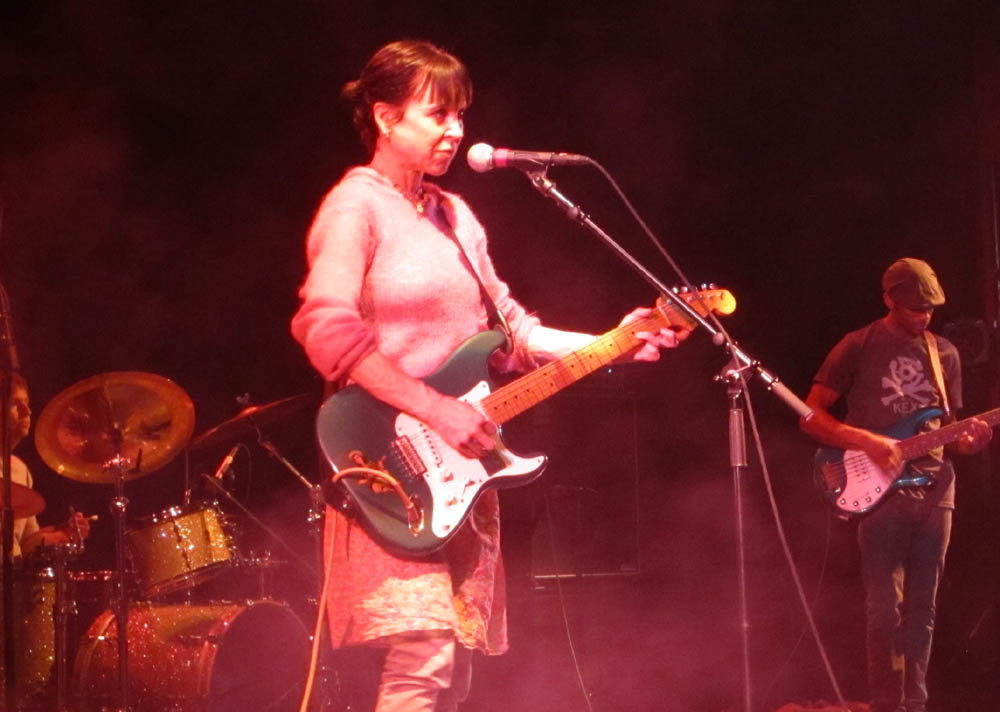
Throwing Muses, reformed in 2014: David Narcizo, Hersh, Bernard Georges at the Noise Pop Festival in San Francisco, February 2014

Hersh's vocal style ranges from softly melodic to impassioned screaming. She has an occasional vibrato that punctuates some of her more dramatic phrasing. Candid about her episodes of mental illness and despair, her songs cover a vast spectrum of topics, including childbirth ("Hysterical Bending"), love ("Tar Kissers", "Lavender"), surreal vignettes ("Delicate Cutters", "Fish"), death ("Limbo"), emotional anguish ("The Letter"), loss of custody of her first son ("Candyland"), and the shedding of a relationship's anxiety ("Snake Oil").

Simon Reynolds in The New York Times pointed to Hersh's "mesmerizing" explorations of "rage, aggression and mental chaos" as evidence of female rock artists of the early 1990s pushing against gender role boundaries to express "more than simply vulnerability or defiance" in their work. Ann Powers, also in the Times, wrote of Hersh's musical style: "Her plastic, sometimes obsessively circular song structures emphasize staggered rhythms and extreme dynamic shifts, and her voice, a carnal cry that pushes through her body gathering up air, lends her often oblique lyrics an oracular veneer."

=== Influences ===
Hersh has said her parents' album collections featuring Patti Smith, the Carter Family, Stevie Wonder, Robert Johnson, Talking Heads, the Clash, Steve Miller, the Beatles, Philip Glass, and traditional music influenced her when she was growing up. Among her early contemporary musical influences are the Raincoats, the Pretenders, Talking Heads, Violent Femmes, Meat Puppets, Dead Kennedys, Hüsker Dü, the Velvet Underground, R.E.M., and X.

== Author ==
Hersh's illustrated children's book Toby Snax was published in 2007 and further developed in 2011 as an interactive app for children. The app allows children to hear her read the story out loud and features her recordings of lullabies that she learned as a girl in Tennessee.

Her 2010 memoir Rat Girl (published in the UK as Paradoxical Undressing) is based on a diary she wrote when she was 18, touring with Throwing Muses, diagnosed with bipolar disorder and pregnant with her first child. Rob Sheffield in The New York Times called it an "uncommonly touching punk memoir," and named it No. 8 in Rolling Stone's "25 Greatest Rock Memoirs of All Time." Her 2015 book Don't Suck, Don't Die: Giving Up Vic Chesnutt, is a rumination on her friendship with the singer-songwriter Vic Chesnutt. She cites him as being one of her songwriting influences with his "fluid timing and the grace of a melody that breaks the rules of meter."

== Personal life ==
Hersh was married to her former manager Billy O'Connell for 25 years and they divorced in 2013. They have four sons. As of 2020, she is engaged to former Throwing Muses bassist Fred Abong.

Hersh has talked openly about her bouts with mental illness and its role in her musical process. When she was 16, she was struck by a car while riding her bicycle, suffering a double concussion that affected the way she heard sounds. She described it as hearing ambient sounds continuously and "the sounds would alter their sonic vocabulary until I was hearing syllables, and drums... then all these words would come". She has said that hearing "pieces of songs" in her mind compelled her to take the pieces apart and craft songs from them. She claims that she doesn't remember writing her early songs—that "they wrote her". Hersh has synesthesia; she sees musical chords in colors.

She has had more than one diagnosis (and misdiagnoses) for her condition including schizophrenia, bipolar disorder, and most recently post-traumatic and dissociative disorders, which she says have been successfully treated with eye movement desensitization and reprocessing (EMDR) therapy. In 2023, Hersh was revealed to be autistic.

== Solo works discography ==
=== Studio albums ===
- Hips and Makers (1994)
- Strange Angels (1998)
- Murder, Misery and Then Goodnight (1998)
- Sky Motel (1999)
- Sunny Border Blue (2001)
- The Grotto (2003)
- Learn to Sing Like a Star (2007)
- Speedbath (2008, under a Creative Commons License)
- Crooked (2010)
- Wyatt at the Coyote Palace (2016)
- Possible Dust Clouds (2018)
- Clear Pond Road (2023)
- Sugar on Blackstone (2026)

=== Cover songs ===
- "Wave of Mutilation" (Pixies) – American Laundromat Records, High School Reunion: a tribute to those great 80's films!, 2005
- "Like a Hurricane" (Neil Young) – American Laundromat Records, Cinnamon Girl: Women Artists Cover Neil Young for Charity, 2008
- "Panic Pure" (Vic Chesnutt) – Columbia Records, Sweet Relief II: Gravity of the Situation, 1996

== Books ==
- Toby Snax. Delicate, 2007. ISBN 978-1934703014.
- Rat Girl. New York: Penguin, 2010. ISBN 978-0143117391.
- Paradoxical Undressing. Atlantic, 2011. ISBN 978-1848872394.
- Don't Suck, Don't Die: Giving Up Vic Chesnutt. Austin: University of Texas Press, 2015. ISBN 978-0292759473.
- Toby Snax. Austin: University of Texas Press, 2016. ISBN 978-1477311271.
- Don't Suck, Don't Die: Giving Up Vic Chesnutt. American Music Series. Austin: University of Texas Press, 2016. ISBN 978-1477311363. With a foreword by Amanda Petrusich.
- Nerve Endings: Selected Lyrics. Unbound, 2018. ISBN 978-1783525638.
- Seeing Sideways: A Memoir of Music and Motherhood. University of Texas Press, 2021. ISBN 978-1477312346.
- THE FUTURE of SONGWRITING. Melville House Publishing, 2024. ISBN 978-1685891176

== Sources ==
- Evans, Liz (1994). Women, Sex and Rock 'N' Roll: In Their Own Words. Pandora. ISBN 0-04-440900-1
- Post, Laura (1997). Backstage Pass: Interviews With Women in Music. New Victoria Publishers. ISBN 0-934678-84-7
- Shirley, David (November/December 1991). "Cracking Up Is Hard to Do: The Break-ups (and Breakdowns) of Throwing Muses". Option
