= Rock 'n' Roll Rumble =

American radio competition

- Genre: rock and roll, pop, alternative rock, power pop, punk rock, metal, hardcore, Americana, synthpop, folk rock, hip hop
- Locations: Greater Boston, Massachusetts, United States
- Years active: 1979–present
- Website: rockandrollrumble.com

The Rock 'n' Roll Rumble (now stylized as "Rock & Roll Rumble"; formerly the "WBCN Rock 'n' Roll Rumble") is a Greater Boston "battle of the bands" competition sponsored by Boston Emissions, an online local music program formerly broadcast on WBCN (from 1987 until 2008) and WZLX (from 2009 until 2018). Launching in 1979, the Rumble remains the longest running event of its kind in the US.

Its predecessors were the Bicentennial Tournament of the Bands held in 1976 at The Club in Cambridge, Massachusetts, and co-sponsored by WBCN and Inn Square Men's Bar, as well as 1978's First Annual Spring Rock 'n' Roll Festival co-sponsored by WBCN and the Boston Phoenix.

The Rock 'n' Roll Rumble was held in Boston at the Rathskeller in Kenmore Square for its first two years and was often referred to as "the Rumble at the Rat". Steve Morse of the Boston Globe called the 1979 debut competition "nine nights of exhilarating grass-roots rock." Since then, the competition's venue has changed several times but remains a popular showcase for New England bands to gain visibility.

The Rumble is hosted and produced by Boston DJ Anngelle Wood, host of Boston Emissions.

== Format ==
The Rumble in its current form begins in April with six preliminary rounds of 24 total bands, as selected by Anngelle Wood. Through 2017, the prelims took place on Sunday through Tuesday and Thursday through Saturday, with Wednesday as a traditional "Day of Rest"; beginning in 2019, the prelims were split over two consecutive weekends. Each night, four bands play a 30-minute set and are judged by a rotating selection of representatives from the Boston music industry. A winner is announced at the end of the night.

Each night's winner moves on to the semi-finals the following weekend, with two wildcard bands rounding out the top 8. The two semi-final winners are joined by one wildcard band for the final round the week after that. A special guest, often a national touring band or a previous Rumble participant, headlines the finals while the judges come to their final decision.

Prizes include cash, studio time, legal services, album production, bragging rights, and more. A ceremonial tiara is also passed from the previous year's winning act to the newly crowned champion.

== Eligibility ==
As a courtesy to the music community, Rock & Roll Rumble host and organizer, Anngelle Wood, does provide a way for bands to submit for consideration. Certain requirements for consideration do apply. They include, but are not limited to:

- Band or artist must have sent music to, and received airplay on Boston Emissions with Anngelle Wood, online at BostonEmissions.com
- Band or artist should be established in the music community and actively playing out in the area.
- Band or artist must have released a new recording - song, video, EP or full-length, within the past calendar year.

== Judging criteria ==
As of 2012, The Rumble uses 45 judges (barring unforeseen circumstances), five for each night for the nine nights of competition. Each evening there are representatives from the music business, local media, and on-air personalities from local radio judging the bands. The judges observe each band and numerically score each 30-minute set. At the end of the night, the judges' scores are tallied two ways:

1. a straight tally of all judges' scores; and
2. a tally throwing out the high and low scores, using the middle scores as a backup in case of a tie or in the rare case of extreme bias in either direction. This method is intended to protect the bands against judging anomalies in the long run.

As of 2014, the judging criteria were slightly revised, based on the discovery of a score card from 1981; the most notable change was the addition of a "stage presence" category. In 2017 the "Bonus" category changed from optional to mandatory.

1. Material: Were songs good, memorable? Did they all sound the same? (possible 1–10 points)

2. Playing Effectiveness: How well did the band play? Were they tight? Intriguing? How did the band represent their genre? (possible 1–10 points)

3. Vocal Effectiveness: How well did vocals (lead & backups) contribute to & enhance band? (possible 1–10 points)

4. Timing: Did band use set time wisely? Did set flow? Did it build in intensity? Did band stop too long? Were they on time? (possible 1–10 points)

5. Stage Presence: How did band present itself? Mannerisms? Banter? Were they fun to watch? Did they interact? Did crowd respond? (possible 1–10 points)

6. Bonus: Category to grant extra points based on any judge's discretion, or the intangibles not covered above; an explanation is requested from the judge. (possible 1–5 points)

== History ==
Year	Winner	Finalists	Venue	Semifinalists
2024	The Ghouls	Gut Health, Other Brother Darryl * ^{‡}	The Middle East and Sonia (Cambridge, MA)	Twig, Wire Lines, Looking Glass War, RoseR, CE Skidmore & the Damn Fine Band *
	Other Participating Bands: Bikethrasher, Cold Expectations, Condition Baker, JATK, Lovina Falls, The Magic City, Mammothor, Never Gonna Make It, Robotic Hawks, The Roland High Life, Ruby Grove, Shiverlane, Shotgun Waltz, Sunshine Riot, Trailer Swift, Type 66 Non-competing Guest Band: Halfcocked (1999 Rumble finalists)			
2023	One Fall	The Chelsea Curve, Ruin the Night ^{‡}	The Middle East and Sonia (Cambridge, MA)	Kooked Out, Not Bad Not Well, Wildcat Slim, Bird Language*, Tysk Tysk Task*
	Other Participating Bands: Bleach the Sky, City of Dis, D-Tension & the Secrets, Devil Love, Donaher, The Endorphins, The Freqs, Graveyard of the Atlantic, Gretchen Shae & the Middle Eight, Kid Disaster, Luxury Deathtrap, Michael Kane & the Morning Afters, Paper Tigers, Parts Per Million, The Shallows, Time Wolf Non-competing Guest Band: Eddie Japan (2013 Rumble winners)			
2022	Cancelled due to COVID-19 pandemic			
2021	Cancelled due to COVID-19 pandemic			
2020	Cancelled due to COVID-19 pandemic			
	Bands: Donaher, The Endorphins, Graveyard of the Atlantic, Gray Bouchard & the Dedications, Hands 3, The Hats, Hyber, Knock Over City, Lady Lupine, Luxury Deathtrap, Mosaic Mirrors, Motel Art, The Only Things^{x}, OroborO^{x}, Pregame Rituals, Rabbithole, Roll Over White, The Shallows, The Shirts & Shoes, TimewolfWargraves, War on Alexandria, Wax On, Wildcat Slim, Wire Lines, Yoni Gordon & the Goods Non-competing Guest Band: Set Fire (2019 Rumble winners)			
2019	Set Fire	PowerSlut, Corner Soul * ^{‡}	ONCE Ballroom (Somerville, MA)	Brix’n Mortar, blindspot, Lonely Leesa & the Lost Cowboys, Phenomenal Sun, Motel Black *
	Other Participating Bands: Art Thieves, As the Sparrow, Baabes, Birnam Wood, The Daylilies, Exit 18, FiDEL, The I Want You, Jakals, Justine & the Unclean, Love Love, OfficeR, Radio Compass, Skytigers, Test Meat, This Bliss Non-competing Guest Band: Carissa Johnson & the Cure-Alls (2017 Rumble winners)			
2017	Carissa Johnson	The Rupert Selection, Hey Zeus ^{‡}	ONCE Ballroom (Somerville, MA)	Tom Baker and the Snakes, Red Red Rockit, Stars Like Ours, Diablogato *, The Heave-Ho *
	Other Participating Bands: Barns, Biltmore, City Rivals, Cruel Miracle, Flight of Fire, Heavy Necker, Heel and Arrow, The Humanoids, no hope/no harm, Magen Tracy and the Missed Connections, Matt York and the Missed Flights, Pulitzer Prize Fighter, Rolling Nectar, Something Sneaky, The Tenafly Vipers, You People Non-competing Guest Band: Township (2007 Rumble winners)			
2016	Worshipper	Weakened Friends, usLights ^{‡}	ONCE Ballroom (Somerville, MA)	Analog Heart, Salem Wolves, Abbie Barrett, Eric Salt & the Electric City *, The Devil's Twins *
	Other Participating Bands: 21st Century Fugitives, Big Time Kill, The Black Cheers, Choke Up, Courage Cloak, The Digs, Field Day, Goldblood & Associates, I Was Awake, Idle Pilot, Jack Romanov, Johnny Blazes & the Pretty Boys, Junior Classics, The Knock Ups, The Longwalls, Shatner Non-competing Guest Band: Scissorfight (1997 Rumble semifinalists)			
2015	Zip-Tie Handcuffs	Nemes, The Static Dynamic ^{‡}	TT the Bear's Place (Cambridge, Massachusetts)	Eternals, Dirty Bangs, Soft Pyramids, Duck & Cover *, Murcielago *
	Other Participating Bands: Band Without Hands, Dan Webb and the Spiders, The Dirty Looks, Drab, Le Roxy Pro, Mister Vertigo, Mercury on Mars, Nate Leavitt, New City Ghost, Protean Collective, Psychic Dog, The Rare Occasions, Raw Blow, Salita, The Warning Shots, Yale Massachusetts Non-competing Guest Band: The Gravel Pit (1996 Rumble semifinalists)			
2014	Goddamn Draculas	Petty Morals, Await Rescue ^{‡}	TT the Bear's Place (Cambridge, Massachusetts)	Tigerman WOAH, Barricades, Western Education, When Particles Collide *, FEINTS * ^{x}, Yellabird * ^{§}
	Other Participating Bands: Airport, Butterknife, The Color and Sound, Doom Lover, Emma Ate the Lion, Gondoliers, Guillermo Sexo, Harris Hawk, The Life Electric, Rebuilder, Sinnet, Slowdim, Summoner, Vary Lumar, Z*L Non-competing Guest Band: The Information (2004 Rumble Semifinalist)			
2013	Eddie Japan	Glenn Yoder and the Western States *, Twin Berlin * ^{‡}	TT the Bear's Place (Cambridge, Massachusetts)	The New Highway Hymnal, Camden, Lifestyle, White Dynomite, The Daily Pravda
	Other Participating Bands: blackbutton, Cancer Killing Gemini, Coyote Kolb, The Deep North, Endation, The Field Effect, Herra Terra, Jack Burton vs. David Lo Pan, Mount Peru, The Okay Win, Parks, Ruby Rose Fox, The Suicide Dolls, Supermachine, Velah, Whitcomb Non-competing Guest Band: The Dogmatics (1985 Rumble participants)			
2012	Bow Thayer and Perfect Trainwreck	Garvy J. and The Secret Pockets of Hope and Resistance, Motherboar ^{‡}	TT the Bear's Place (Cambridge, Massachusetts)	The Rationales, Ghosts of Jupiter, Cask Mouse, Thick Shakes *, Sherman Burns *
	Other Participating Bands: Animal Talk, BrownBoot, The Bynars, Cooling Towers, Endless Wave, The Fagettes, Grey Valley Ghost, The Grinds, The Grownup Noise ^{x}, Letterday, Never Got Caught, Parlour Bells, Pray For Polanski, Streight Angular, The Susan Constant, The Tin Thistles Non-competing Guest Band: The Grownup Noise			
2011	John Powhida International Airport	Spirit Kid *, OldJack ^{§} ^{‡}	TT the Bear's Place (Cambridge, Massachusetts)	Jenny Dee and the Deelinquents ^{x}, Walter Sickert and the Army of Broken Toys, Mellow Bravo, Do Not Forsake Me Oh My Darling, Sidewalk Driver, Black Thai *
	Other Participating Bands: The Acro-brats, The Autumn Hollow Band, The Blizzard of 78, Cradle to the Grave, Cult 45, Full Body Anchor, Keep Me Conscious, McAlister Drive, Static of the Gods, Stereo Telescope, Tijuana Sweetheart, Tired Old Bones, TRiPLE THiCK, A Wish For Fire, The Year Million Non-competing Guest Band: The Shods (1999 Rumble finalists)			
2009	The Luxury ^{‡}	Gene Dante and The Future Starlets, The Dirty Truckers	The Middle East (Cambridge, Massachusetts)	Gravehaven, Sarah RabDAU and Self-Employed Assassins, The Lights Out, Have Nots *, Destruct-a-thon *
	Other Participating Bands: Angeline, Logan 5 and the Runners, The Deal, The Minus Scale, Apple Betty, Eksi Ekso, The Fatal Flaw, The Motion Sick, Anarchy Club, Dead Cats Dead Rats, Muy Cansado, Thick As Thieves, The Mystery Tramps, Trucker Mouth, The New Alibis, Gozu Non-Competing Guest Band: The Outlets (1981 Rumble participants)			
2008	Girls Guns and Glory	The Great Bandini, A.K.A.C.O.D. ^{‡}	Harpers Ferry (Allston, MA)	Andrea Gillis, HUMANWINE, The Men, Jason Bennett and the Resistance *, Clouds *
	Other Participating Bands: MEandJOANCOLLINS, Cherry S/T, Cheater Pint, Wild Zero, Daniel Bon and The Future Ghosts, Cortez, Dirt Mall, The Shills, The Murder Mile, Watts, On The Drop, Medicated Kisses, Hel Toro, Forgetful Jones, Genuflect, Disappearer Non-competing Guest Band: The Neighborhoods (1979 Rumble winners)			
2007	Township	Baker, The Indefinite Article ^{‡}	Harpers Ferry (Allston, MA)	The Silver Lining, Protokoll, Eli "Paperboy" Reed, Aloud *, Age Rings *
	Other Participating Bands: Octave Museum, The Appreciation Post, Larkin Brigade, Cassavettes, Ark Royal, My Little Radio, Strictly for the Birds, Six Day Slide, UV Protection, The Self-Righteous Brothers, The Welch Boys, Meet The Day, KID:NAP:KIN, My So-Called Friend, The Vital Might, Hepburn Non-competing Guest Band: Sick Puppies			
2006	Campaign for Real-Time ^{‡}	Scamper, The Rudds	The Middle East Downstairs (Cambridge, Massachusetts)	Appomattox, We're All Gonna Die *, Harris, Eyes Like Knives, Taxpayer *
	Other Participating Bands: Alchemilla, A Hero Next Door, Cocked 'N' Loaded, Mach 5, Plan B, Say When, Casey Desmond, Certainly Sir, Sucka Brown, Tiger Saw, The Coffin Lids, The Sharking, Jonas Complex, Rooftop Suicide Club, Random Acts of Violence, Faces On Film Non-competing Guest Band: Taylor Hawkins and the Coattail Riders			
2005	Reverend Glasseye ^{‡}	Furvis, Robby Roadsteamer *	The Middle East Downstairs (Cambridge, Massachusetts)	Fluttr Effect, The Hidden *, Beyond the Embrace, The Marvels, Muck and the Mires
	Other Participating Bands: Lock & Key, The Bon Savants, Spitzz, Emergency Music, Baby Boy H, Stray Bullets, Car Crash Show, Endway, The Turpentine Brothers, Antler, Sudden Ease, Aberdeen City, Mass Hysteria, Rubikon, Violet Nine, Sand Machine			
2004	Jake Brennan & the Confidence Men	The Dents, The Brett Rosenberg Problem * ^{‡}	The Middle East Downstairs (Cambridge, Massachusetts)	Seemless, Jabe, The Information *, The Model Sons, Stoic
	Other Participating Bands: Black Helicopter, The Charms, Every Forty Seconds, Fooled by April, Ad Frank and the Fast Easy Women, Iluminada, Meat Depressed, Orange Island, Paranoid Social Club, Raymond, Redletter, Roxie, The So and So's, The Spaceshots, Sugabomb, Throe Non-competing Guest Band: Von Bondies			
2003	The Dresden Dolls	Baby Strange, Apollo Sunshine ^{‡}	The Middle East Downstairs (Cambridge, Massachusetts)	Blake Hazard *, Kingsize, The Downbeat 5 *, Favorite Atomic Hero, The Good North
	Other Participating Bands: Absolve, Blackstone Valley Crew, Boxingwater, Donnybrook, Elcodrive, Godboxer, The Halogens, Heavy Stud, Kimone, Labb, Placer, Read Yellow, Reverse, Rocktopus, Suspect Device, Three Day Threshold Non-competing Guest Band: Vendetta Red			
2002	The Gentlemen	Quitter, Mr. Airplane Man ^{‡}	The Middle East Downstairs (Cambridge, Massachusetts)	Lost City Angels, The Damn Personals, Give, Milligram *, The Jaded Salingers *
	Other Participating Bands: All the Queen's Men, Auto Interiors, Averi, Calendar Girl, Chauncey, Crash and Burn, Hazie Maze, House of the Almighty, Loveless, Major Major, Mappari, Mishima USA, Munk, Spookie Daly Pride, Throne, The Meghan Toohey Band Non-competing Guest Band: Black Rebel Motorcycle Club			
2001	Bleu	Cracktorch, The Kings of Nuthin' ^{‡}	The Middle East Downstairs (Cambridge, Massachusetts)	The Decals, Freezepop, Lamont, AM Stereo *, Diecast *
	Other Participating Bands: Banjo Spiders, Euonym, Flynn, Francine, Gage, Garrison, The High Ceilings, The In Out, Jericho, Johnny Wishbone, Junction 18, The Kitty Kill, Pennywheel, Reach the Sky, Say Hi to Lisa, Slater Non-Competing Guest Band: Darkbuster (2000 Rumble winners)			
2000	Darkbuster	Waltham, Rocketscience ^{‡}	The Middle East Downstairs (Cambridge, Massachusetts)	Colepitz, The Big Bad Bollocks, Helicopter Helicopter, The Dubnicks, Random Road Mother *
	Other Participating Bands: Caged Heat, Dragstrip Courage, Every Second, The Fly Seville, Godboy, Long Distance Runner, Missing Joe, The Mission 120, NOK, Psychotic Larry, Rock City Crimewave, Scarlet Haven, 7th Rail Crew, There, Wide Iris, The World Is My Fuse			
1999	The Sheila Divine	The Shods, Halfcocked ^{‡}	The Middle East Downstairs (Cambridge, Massachusetts)	Kicked in the Head, Honeyglazed, Cheerleadr, Superhoney, The Raging Teens
	Other Participating Bands: Baby Ray, Big Lick, Brass Monkeys, Canine, Cave In, Control Group, Drexel, Fastbreak, Gangsta Bitch Barbie, Honeyglazed, Jumprope, Kicked in the Head, Lunar Plexus, Ms. Pigeon, Quick Fix, Red Eye 9, Señor Happy, Seventeen Non-Competing Guest Band: Freestylers			
1998	The Ghost of Tony Gold	Vic Firecracker, American Measles	The Middle East Downstairs (Cambridge, Massachusetts)	Lockgroove *, Big D and the Kids Table, The Racketeers, American Measles, Tugboat Annie, Wicked Farleys *
	Other Participating Bands: Betty Goo, Betwixt, Big Wig, The Ducky Boys, Full Powered Halo, Inhale Mary, January, Lockgroove, Max, Mindflow, My Favorite Relative, Piebald, Pistola, Sameasyou, Shyness Clinic, Star Ghost Dog, Ultrabreakfast Non-competing Guest Band: Pure			
1997	The Amazing Royal Crowns	Ramona Silver	The Middle East Downstairs (Cambridge, Massachusetts)	Cherry 2000 *, Verago-go, Scissorfight, Bright *, Count Zero, Amazing Royal Crowns, Laurie Geltman Band
	Other Participating Bands: Boy Wonder, Cast Iron Hike, Chevy Heston, Delta Clutch, Eight Ball Shifter, Five Seconds Expired, Lincolnville, Mudhens, One Fine Mess, One of Us, The Pills, Rosemary Caine, Red Time, Splashdown, Standing on Earth, The Sterlings, 3½ Girls Non-competing Guest Band: Fluffy			
1996	Trona	Quintaine Americana	The Middle East Downstairs (Cambridge, Massachusetts)	Skavoovie and the Epitones, The Red Telephone, Jules Verdone, Turkish Delight, The Gravel Pit, Jocobono
	Other Participating Bands: Bald Guys, Bison, Blauzur, Chelsea on Fire, Deliriants, Honkyball, Jabbering Trout, Jack Frosting, Pie, Plank, Roadsaw, St. Chimaera, Thought Junkie, Ukla, Underball, V-Card			
1995	Doc Hopper	Pooka Stew	The Middle East Downstairs (Cambridge, Massachusetts)	Groovasurus, Expanding Man, Otis, Quivvver, The Vehicle Birth, Mistle Thrush
	Other Participating Bands: Angry Salad, Chainsuck, Crawl, Curious Ritual, The Curtain Society, Fly Spinach Fly, Little John, Nana, Planet Be, Planet Jumper, Rippopotamus, sirensong, Slide, Still Home, Syrup USA, Waiting Kates Non-competing Guest Band: The Muffs Host: Lenny Kravitz			
1994	The Dirt Merchants	6L6	Paradise Rock Club (Boston, MA)	Machinery Hall, Slughog, Smackmelon, Opium Den, Cold Water Flat, Merang
	Other Participating Bands: Blair's Carriage, Courage Brothers, Gingerbutkis, Groove Butcher, Hartwell, Headcleaner, Kudgel, Mung, Pods, Scotch, Sextiles, Squid, Stickmen, Tacklebox, Thumper, Jennifer Trynin Band Non-competing Guest Band: Gilby Clarke Host: Iggy Pop			
1993	Cobalt 60 (subsequently renamed C60)	Malachite	Paradise Rock Club (Boston, MA)	Twisted Roots, Pipes, Facts About Rats, Fleshflower, Flying Nuns
	Other Participating Bands: Augusta Furnace, Brave New World, Chloe, Chuck, Dante's Grin, DDT, Dreams Made Flesh, Grind, Jigsaws, Laurels, Mercy Beat, Mr. Stone's Country, Restless Souls, Sextons, Tree, Sidewalk Gallery, Thinner Non-competing Guest Band: Jellyfish Host: Katey Sagal			
1992	Big Catholic Guilt	The Concussion Ensemble	Paradise Rock Club (Boston, MA)	Fighting Cocks, Letters to Cleo *, Orangutang, Sam Black Church, Stomp Box, Morphine *
	Other Participating Bands: The Barnies, Braindance, Burnbox, Crazy Alice, Hotbox, Paper Squares, Parade, Powerman 5000, Sexploitation, Subterraneans, Swinging Steaks, Trojan Ponies, The Uninvited, Vision Thing, Wadi Trip, Zouts			
1991	Seka	Uncle Betty	Paradise Rock Club (Boston, MA)	Jamie Rubin & His Bohemian Love Fest, Cliffs of Dooneen, Left Nut, Bulkhead, Lazy Susan, Maelstrom
	Other Participating Bands: Bulkhead, The Dambuilders, The Derangers, Divinity School, Eletrichka, Fertile Virgin, Grand Theft Auto, Hellcats from Outer Space, Jon Finn Group, Laughing Academy, Miles Dethmuffen, Mindgrinder, Nisi Period, Pact, Still Life, Storm Window, Wrecking Crew Non-competing Guest Band: John Wesley Harding			
1990	Slaughter Shack	Talking to Animals	Paradise Rock Club (Boston, MA)	We Saw The Wolf *, Daisy Chain, Gigolo Aunts, Delusions of Grandeur, The Immortals, Zug Zug
	Other Participating Bands: Border Patrol, Drumming on Glass, El Caminos, Ex-Girlfriends, Gingerbread Men, Green Magnet School, Hollow Heyday, Joe, Miranda Warning, The Nor'easters, Scatterfield, Voodoo Dolls, Vow of Silence, Who Be Dat?, Whoville, Miss Xanna Don't Non-competing Guest Band: NRBQ			
1989	The Bags	Ultra Blue	Paradise Rock Club (Boston, MA)	Blood Oranges, Big Barn Burning, The Jones, Anastasia Screamed, The Premiers, Well Babys
	Other Participating Bands: Big Train, Blake Babies, Blood Oranges, Busted Statues, Circle Sky, Common Ailments of Maturity, Happy Campers, Hell Toupee, Hullabaloo, Idle Hands, Johnny and the Jumper Cables, The Joneses, Kid Crash, Garr Lange and the Big Rig, Pieces, A Scanner Darkly, Slapshot, Two Saints Non-competing Guest Band: King Swamp			
1988	Heretix	Tribe	Paradise Rock Club (Boston, MA)	Bim Skala Bim, Incredible Casuals, Dogzilla, Plate o' Shrimp, Bullet LaVolta, The Lemonheads
	Other Participating Bands: As Is, Citizenz, Class Action, Dharma Bums, Dixie Cinema, Forever 19, Great Divide, Matweeds, Neutral Nation, 1.4.5, One Life, Pat on the Back, Raindogs, Runaway Dan, Slaves, Think Tree, Titanics Non-competing Guest Band: Soul Asylum			
1987	Childhood	The Rain	Spit; semi-finals at The Metro; finals at The Orpheum (Boston, MA)	Dr. Black's Combo, Nova Mob, Rapture of the Deep*, Shake the Faith*, Treat Her Right, The Unattached
	Other Participating Bands: Ammo, Big Dipper, The Catalinas, The Cavedogs, Gotham City, Al Halliday and the Hurricanes, Tom Keegan and the Language, Moose and the Mudbugs, Moving Targets, Powerglide, Struggle, T.H. and the Wreckage, The Taint, Tears, Vasco da Gama, The Wickermen Non-competing Guest Band: Steve Jones			
1986	Gang Green	Hearts On Fire	Spit; semi-finals at The Metro; finals at The Orpheum (Boston, MA)	Beat Surrender*, Blockyard*, Body English, The Condo Pygmies, The Oysters, Volcano Suns
	Other Participating Bands: Bang, The Bristols, The Buddy System, Capture the Flag, Children of Paradise, Cut 299, Eighth Route Army, Expose, The Five, Loose Ties, The Not, Pulse 8, Semper Fi, True Blue, The Visigoths, World at Play Non-competing Guest Bands: The Del Fuegos, Peter Wolf			
1985	Down Avenue	Adventure Set	Spit; semi-finals at The Metro; finals at The Orpheum (Boston, MA)	Bamboo Gang, Chain Link Fence, The F.U.'s, Life on Earth*, Scruffy the Cat, The Souls*
	Other Participating Bands: Ata-Tat, Band 19, The Blaros, The Dogmatics, Dumptruck, Fingerpaint, Holy Cow, Last Stand, The Lowgistics, MX, New Man, O Positive, Rash of Stabbings, Sons of Sappho, The Underachievers, Vandykes			
1984	The Schemers	Dub7	Spit; finals at The Metro (Boston, MA)	Athens, The Gluons, Rods and Cones, Those Upstarts
	Other Participating Bands: Axminster, Ball and Pivot, The Blackjacks, Breakfast in Bed, The Drive, Going Graffiti, Judy's Tiny Head, Pink Cadillac, Push Push, Red, The Reflectors, Ron Scarlett, Skin, SSD, Three Hands, The Turbines, Two Million B.C., Wild Kingdom Non-competing guest band: Joan Jett			
1983	'Til Tuesday	Sex Execs	Spit; finals at The Metro (Boston, MA)	The Del Fuegos, Digney Fignus, M.I.A.'s, Smegma and the Nunz
	Other Participating Bands: Mickey Bliss, The Catch, Christmas, Drezniak, Jeff and Jane Hudson, Jerry's Kids, The Lifters, Lizzie Borden and the Axes, The Nebulas, New Romance, The Phantoms, Prime Movers, Psycho, Radio Novena, Salem 66, Stickball, 3 Colors, The Mike Viola Alliance Non-competing guest band: The Alarm			
1982	Limbo Race	Hi-Beams	Spit; finals at The Metro (Boston, MA)	Chris Martin Group, Primary Colors, The Proletariat, Gary Shane and the Detour
	Other Participating Bands: Angry Young Bees, Dangerous Birds, The Dream, The Enemy, Fire Dept., Foreign Legion, The Jackals, Johnny A's Hidden Secret, The Last Sacrifice, The Mighty Ions, Native Tongue, New Career featuring Audrey Clark, Primitive Romance, Puppet Rulers, Redline, 21-645, The Wild Stares, Zodio Doze			
1981	Someone and The Somebodies	The Dark	Spit; finals at The Metro (Boston, MA)	Young Snakes, Face to Face, ...
	Other Participating Bands: Art Yard, Balloon, Creamers, Death in the Shopping Malls, Extremes, Freeze, Future Dads, Junkmail, Tennie Komar and the Silencers, Lines, Modes, The Neats, The Outlets, Planet Street, Runes, Satellites, The Stains, Suade Cowboys, Swinger's Resort, V;			
1980	Pastiche	France	The Rat (Boston, MA)	Third Rail, The Peter Dayton Band, Peytons, Remakes
	Other Participating Bands: American Teen, Boys Life, Darling, Peter Dayton Band, Eggs, Ground Zero, Harlequin, Hot Dates, Hot Tips, Loners, Make, Mirrors, MPC and the Instigators, Names, Nationals, Shades, Slow Children, Sonics, Trademarks			
1979	The Neighborhoods	La Peste	The Rat (Boston, MA)	?
	Other Participating Bands: Arion Deuce, Charge, Classic Ruins, Dawgs, Harlequin, Hits, Jets, Kid Morocco, Lazers, Lyres, The Maps, Meltdown, Mission of Burma, Phobia, Reckless, Rings, The Streets, Marc Thor, Thrills, Unnatural Axe, Vinny Band, Zoo Types			
1978	La Peste	The Mechanics	Inn Square Men's Bar	?
	Other Participating Bands: Baby's Arm, Lazers, The Stompers, Marc Thor, Thrills, Unnatural Axe			
1976	Willie Alexander and the Boom Boom Band		The Club in Cambridge	?
	Other Participating Bands: Back Alley Band, Boize, Fox Pass, High Heels, Infliktors, Marshalls, Pep's Energy, Third Rail			

* = wildcard from preliminary round

^{‡} = wildcard from semifinal round

^{x} = withdrew from competition

^{§} = runner-up in preliminary round; re-entered competition due to another band's withdrawal

== Notable circumstances ==
1995: Pooka Stew, then one of the area's top-drawing live rock acts, were two songs into their finals set when the power to the PA in the Middle East went off without explanation. The band finished their set without the PA, which came on again for eventual winner Doc Hopper's set. In their finals set, Doc Hopper destroyed a toilet onstage with sledge hammers.

1999: After a tie in the semifinals, which would have given a three-way final matchup, WBCN introduced a wild card into the final round.

2010: There was no Rock 'n' Roll Rumble this year, due to the reorganization of CBS Radio's Boston stations and the loss of WBCN's FM broadcast.

2011: Jenny Dee and the Deelinquents made Rumble history by becoming the first band to drop out of the competition, due to a scheduling conflict, after winning their preliminary night. This allowed a previously eliminated band, OldJack, to re-enter the competition in the semifinal round, having been the runner-up on the night that Jenny Dee won.

2012: The Grownup Noise withdrew from the Rumble (prior to performing) due to an injury sustained by one of its members; they were invited back as the non-competing guest band to play at the finals.

2013: Night two of the semifinals was postponed due to the lockdown of the city during the April 19 manhunt for the Boston Marathon bombing suspects.

2014: FEINTS withdrew from the competition, prior to their semifinal performance, due to illness. Yellabird, as runner-up in the preliminary round, assumed their place in the semifinals.

2017: A fire alarm during the finals forced the evacuation of the Once Ballroom during Carissa Johnson's set. Johnson went on to win the Rumble.

2018: In November 2017, Boston Emissions host station WZLX was sold to iHeartMedia, and the transition and reorganization forced a postponement of the 2018 Rumble.

2019: After the long-running radio show, Boston Emissions, was cancelled by the new station owners, radio show host and event producer, Anngelle Wood, organized the Rock & Roll Rumble independently.

== Sources ==
- New England Music Scrapbook
- The Noise
- RockandRollRumble.com
- BostonEmissions.com
