= Limbo Race =

American post-punk band

Limbo Race was an American post-punk band formed in Boston, Massachusetts in 1979 by Randy Black on guitar, John Neidhart on bass, and Peter Keaveney on drums. In 1981, Keaveney was replaced by drummer Mark Poulin and the band added saxophonist Mark Chenevert. Limbo Race featured an angular, sometimes harsh sound that some critics compared to the Gang of Four and The Cure. Black's lyrics described an unsettled world where communication was difficult, and drew upon dark anthropological references, images from childhood, and intimate details of his relationships with friends and lovers.
Limbo Race developed a passionate cult following and, after winning the WBCN Rock & Roll Rumble in 1982, the band added keyboardist Catherine Coleman and toured extensively throughout the Northeastern United States until 1984 when the band finally broke up.

== History ==
Limbo Race played their first show in 1980 at the legendary Underground, a rock club in Allston, MA, notable for being one of the first venues to feature acts from the burgeoning post-punk and experimental music scene in Boston. For two years, the band played in other small Boston and Cambridge venues including Cantones, Mavericks, The Rathskellar ("The Rat"), The Club, the Inn Square Men's Bar and in alternative venues along Thayer Street in Boston's South End.

Among the many Boston bands that Limbo Race shared bills with were Someone & The Somebodies, Mission of Burma, The New Models, V;, Art Yard, The Neats, The Proletariat, The Neighborhoods, Lou Miami & The Kozmetix, Native Tongue, The Young Snakes, 'til tuesday, The New Models, and The Del Fuegos.

Drummer Peter Keaveney left the band in early 1981 and was replaced by Mark Poulin. At this time, the band recorded their first tape of the song Cigarettes which received airplay on the MIT radio station WMBR as well as on WERS from Emerson College.

In 1981, the band caught the attention of producer and engineer Dan Salzmann who brought them into the studio to record a song, There Goes Kafka, which was included on a compilation of Boston-area bands called A Wicked Good Time Vol.2.

In early 1982, the band added saxophonist Mark Chenevert and keyboardist Catherine Coleman and recorded their first single, Down & Backwards b/w What It Is, which received airplay on the commercial radio station WBCN. The band began to receive media attention and was invited to play at the 1982 WBCN Rock & Roll Rumble which they went on to win. Limbo Race was not included in the list of bands originally invited but as an alternate; they entered the competition only when another band had to drop out.

The band was picked up by manager Jim Coffman, who also managed Mission of Burma, and began playing shows throughout the northeast including the famed CBGB in New York, the 9:30 Club in Washington DC and other venues. In 1983 they also opened for the Thompson Twins and Echo & the Bunnymen at the Channel in Boston, as well for R.E.M. at Streets in Allston.

== Beyond Limbo Race ==
In 1984, drummer Mark Poulin left the band. After attempting to find a new drummer and carry on, the remaining members of the band decided that the end had come and disbanded in the spring.

Randy Black went on to form a new ensemble called Dr. Black's Combo which also included saxophonist Mark Chenevert. He also has a lengthy career as a solo artist playing primarily acoustic and recorded a critically well received CD Below The Tapering for Waterbug Records.

Bassist John Neidhart continued playing in numerous Boston-area bands that included The Wickermen, The Sextons, Stardarts, and Jack Frosting.

Mark Chenevert continues to perform as a respected clarinetist and sax player and has played and toured throughout the United States with bands that include Hypnotic Clambake, Chandler Travis, Stone Lily, and others.

Mark Poulin continues to perform as both a drummer and guitarist, notably in a tribute to Roy Orbison.

== Recordings & Discography ==
Song	Year	Album/Label	Producer/Engineer
Cigarettes	1980	Radio tape	Ted St.Pierre
There Goes Kafka	1981	A Wicked Good Time Vol. 2, Modern Method 011	Dan Salzman
Down & Backwards b/w What It Is	1982	7" Single, 45, Limborations	John Kusiak/Ken Kanavos
Ina's Song b/w Small Talking	1983	7" Single, 45, Limborations	John Kusiak/David Butler
Bless Me Father	1983	Radio tape	John Kusiak/David Butler
Fluids	1983	Crawling From Within (Compilation), 77 Records	John Kusiak
In Your Breath	1983	Crawling From Within (Compilation), 77 Records	John Kusiak
