= Harpers Ferry (nightclub) =

Live music venue and bar in Massachusetts, US

Coordinates: 42°21′10.5″N 71°7′57.4″W

Harpers Ferry was a live music venue and bar in the Allston neighborhood of Boston, Massachusetts. It was in the high traffic central student section of Boston, equidistant from both Boston College and Boston University. Hosting national touring acts and regional acts, Harpers Ferry became known as "Boston's Best Live Music". The development of the "Allston Rock City" music scene centered on Harpers Ferry as a primary venue. Harpers Ferry closed down unexpectedly on October 31, 2010. The location is now home to the Brighton Music Hall.

== History ==
Harpers Ferry had a reputation throughout the Boston area as being an important venue in the hardcore music scene. After the closure of The Rathskeller, a famous venue in Kenmore Square, many of the hardcore bands that called The Rat home moved to The Middle East in the Central Square scene in Cambridge, Massachusetts or to Harpers Ferry.

The WBCN Rock & Roll Rumble was held at Harpers Ferry in 2007 and 2008.

On March 17, 2007, Dropkick Murphys performed their 2007 St. Patrick's Day show at Harpers Ferry.

Years ago blues and rhythm and blues music was featured prominently at the club, including a yearly blues festival in February and an annual Battle of the Blues Bands.

Harpers Ferry abruptly closed in October 2010 following an unresolved dispute between the club's general manager and the landlord. Several months of performances were cancelled so the club could close.

== Brighton Music Hall ==
Rapper Pi'erre Bourne performing live at Brighton Music Hall in 2026.

In 2011, the venue on Brighton Avenue reopened as Brighton Music Hall. The 476-capacity club continues to serve the Allston neighborhood as a live music venue for national touring acts across various musical genres.

== Notable musical performances ==
The following have performed at Harpers Ferry:

- Fall Out Boy
- James Cotton
- Chiddy Bang
- Buddy Guy
- Sleepy LaBeef
- Bo Diddley
- Johnny Winter
- Matt "Guitar" Murphy
- Dropkick Murphys
- Gym Class Heroes
- Sister Hazel
- Miike Snow
- Converge
- Everybody Out!
- The Unseen
- Zox
- MxPx
- 3OH!3
- Street Dogs
- Jay Reatard
- Catch 22
- Darkbuster
- Andrew W.K
- Lazlo Hollyfeld
- The Ducky Boys
- Fishbone
- The Casualties
- K'Naan
- Roger Clyne
- Assembly of Dust
- The Receiving End of Sirens
- Zac Brown Band
- Susan Tedeschi
- Little Feat
