= Xmortis =

Goth event in Cambridge, Massachusetts, United States

Coordinates: 42.3638°N 71.1015°W

Xmortis is a monthly goth night held on the second Friday of the month in Cambridge, Massachusetts.

== History ==
Xmortis was started in July 2004. The event was founded by Latex Lily and Patman the Avenger, who at the time were a longtime couple in the Boston goth scene. Their romance was featured in the Boston Globe.

Xmortis' predecessor was a goth event called Hell (known for its catchy title; event-goers could say they were "going to Hell"). Hell was held monthly at Manray, Boston's best-known goth club, until the event ended in its 11th year. Xmortis continued the tradition at Manray until the club's close in July 2005. Xmortis was then moved across the street to the well-known rock club T.T. the Bear's Place. In July 2015 T.T.'s closed, and the event moved next door to the Middle East Downstairs, with DJ Chris Ewen of the Future Bible Heroes and a range of guest DJs.

== Themes ==
Though Xmortis is a goth night, the events typically feature a different theme each month. Past themes include X-Mortis (a comic book-themed night, the name is styled with the hyphen, a la X-Men), Monster A-Go-Go (a night of gothic greasers, and vintage horror), and Fashion Victims, a night of gothic fashion shows.
