= Cionico =

Venezuelan-American musical group

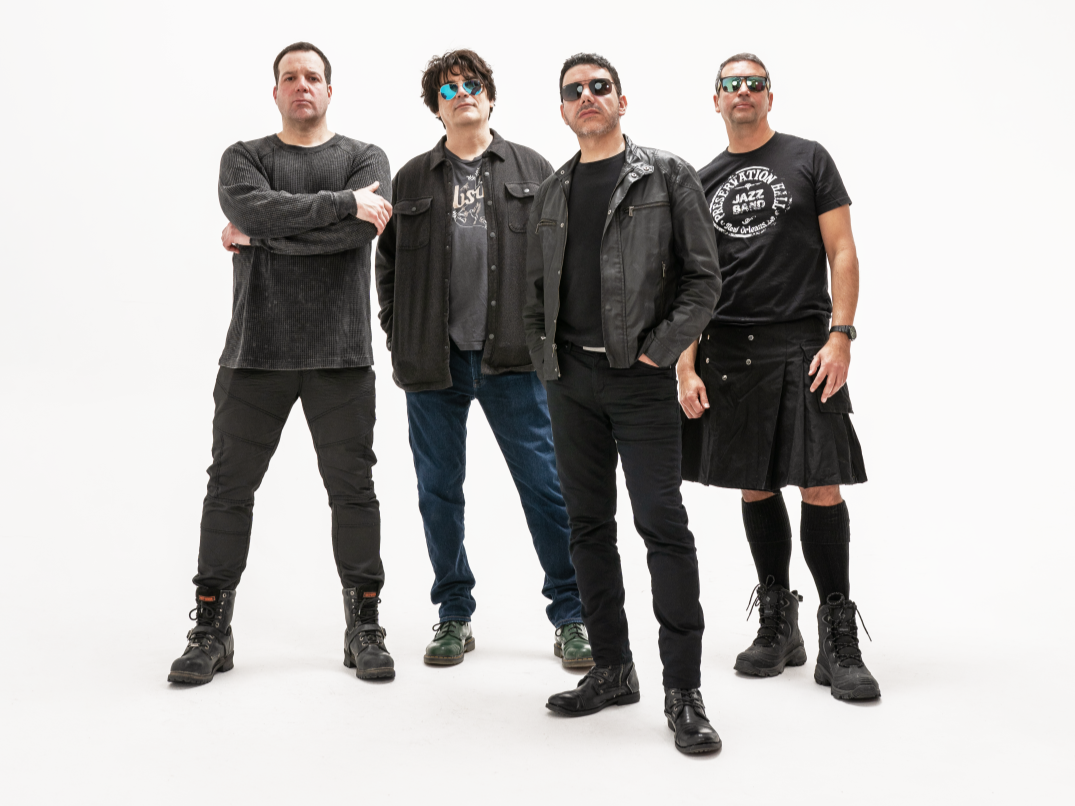
- Cionico band members in 2025: Oscar Balza, Wade Torres, Leo Rojo, Gerardo Pérez Giusti

Background information
- Origin: Maracaibo, Venezuela
- Genres: Hard rock; alternative rock; electronica; ambient
- Years active: 2011–present
- Label: Independent
- Members: Leo Rojo; Wade Torres; Gerardo Pérez Giusti; Oscar Balza
- Past members: Diego Scarpelli; Julio Serra; José Ángel Cavallini; Rafael Ciciruca; Armando Bohórquez; Freddy Parra
- Website: cionico.com

Cionico is a Venezuelan–American rock band formed in Maracaibo, Venezuela, in 2011. Since 2023, the band has consisted of Leo Rojo (lead vocals, guitar), Wade Torres (guitar), Gerardo Pérez Giusti (bass, keyboards), and Oscar Balza (drums). The band has released one studio album, No Hay Espacio En El Cielo (2022), and the English-language EP Spoken Portrait (2025).

== History ==
=== Formation and early development (2011–2015) ===
Cionico was founded in 2011 by drummer Oscar Balza as a solo project in Maracaibo, Venezuela. Balza collaborated with vocalist Julio Serra and keyboardist José Ángel Cavallini on early material that would later form part of the debut album No Hay Espacio En El Cielo. The recording process was affected by Venezuela's electricity crisis, which forced sessions to move between several cities including Maracaibo, San Cristóbal, and Valencia.

=== Relocation and lineup changes (2015–2019) ===
In 2015, Balza relocated to the United States, settling in Houston, Texas, where recording resumed. After Serra's departure, vocalist Diego Scarpelli joined in 2019, and producer Bob St. John remixed and mastered the material. Guitarist Wade Torres also joined the project during this period.

=== Commercial releases and live performances (2019–2023) ===
Cionico released its first single, "Esperaré," on 25 September 2019, followed by "Todo" on 8 November 2019. The band made its live debut in November 2019 at The Middle East in Cambridge, Massachusetts.

The debut studio album, No Hay Espacio En El Cielo, was released on 11 November 2022. It received coverage in Rolling Stone en Español and airplay on Colombian stations Caracol Radio and Blu Radio.

In 2023, the band toured Argentina, where they performed in Buenos Aires and other cities. After the tour, Scarpelli departed, and Cionico continued as a four-piece band.

=== Current lineup and recent releases (2023–present) ===
In October 2023, Leo Rojo became the band's official vocalist and guitarist. The group recorded the English-language EP Spoken Portrait, released on 7 January 2025. The EP featured re-recorded English versions of earlier songs along with the unreleased track "Everything’s Alright".

== Reception ==
Spoken Portrait was named "Best Production of the Year" by the European outlet *Indie Boulevard*, which also featured the band on its cover. The release was also highlighted in Billboard Argentina as part of its list of emerging Latin artists.

== Musical style and influences ==
Cionico's sound combines elements of hard rock, alternative rock, electronica, and ambient music. The band has maintained a bilingual approach since its formation, recording material in both Spanish and English.

== Discography ==
=== Studio albums ===
- No Hay Espacio en el Cielo (2022)

=== Extended plays ===
- Spoken Portrait (2025)

=== Singles ===
- "Esperaré" (2019)
- "Todo" (2019)
- "Roca y Coral" (2020)
- "Diplomático" (2020)
- "No Hay Espacio en el Cielo" (2020)
- "Bocados" (2020)
- "Extraño" (2021)
- "All of Me" (2024)
- "I’ll Wait" (2024)
- "Everything’s Alright" (2024)

== Band members ==
=== Current members ===
- Oscar Balza – drums (2011–present)
- Wade Torres – guitar (2019–present)
- Gerardo Pérez Giusti – bass, keyboards (2020–present)
- Leo Rojo – lead vocals, guitar (2023–present)

=== Former members ===
- Diego Scarpelli – lead vocals (2019–2023)
- Julio Serra – lead vocals (2013–2019)
- José Ángel Cavallini – keyboards (2013–2015)
- Rafael Ciciruca – (dates unknown)
- Armando Bohórquez – (dates unknown)
- Freddy Parra – (dates unknown)
