= Bow Thayer =

American singer

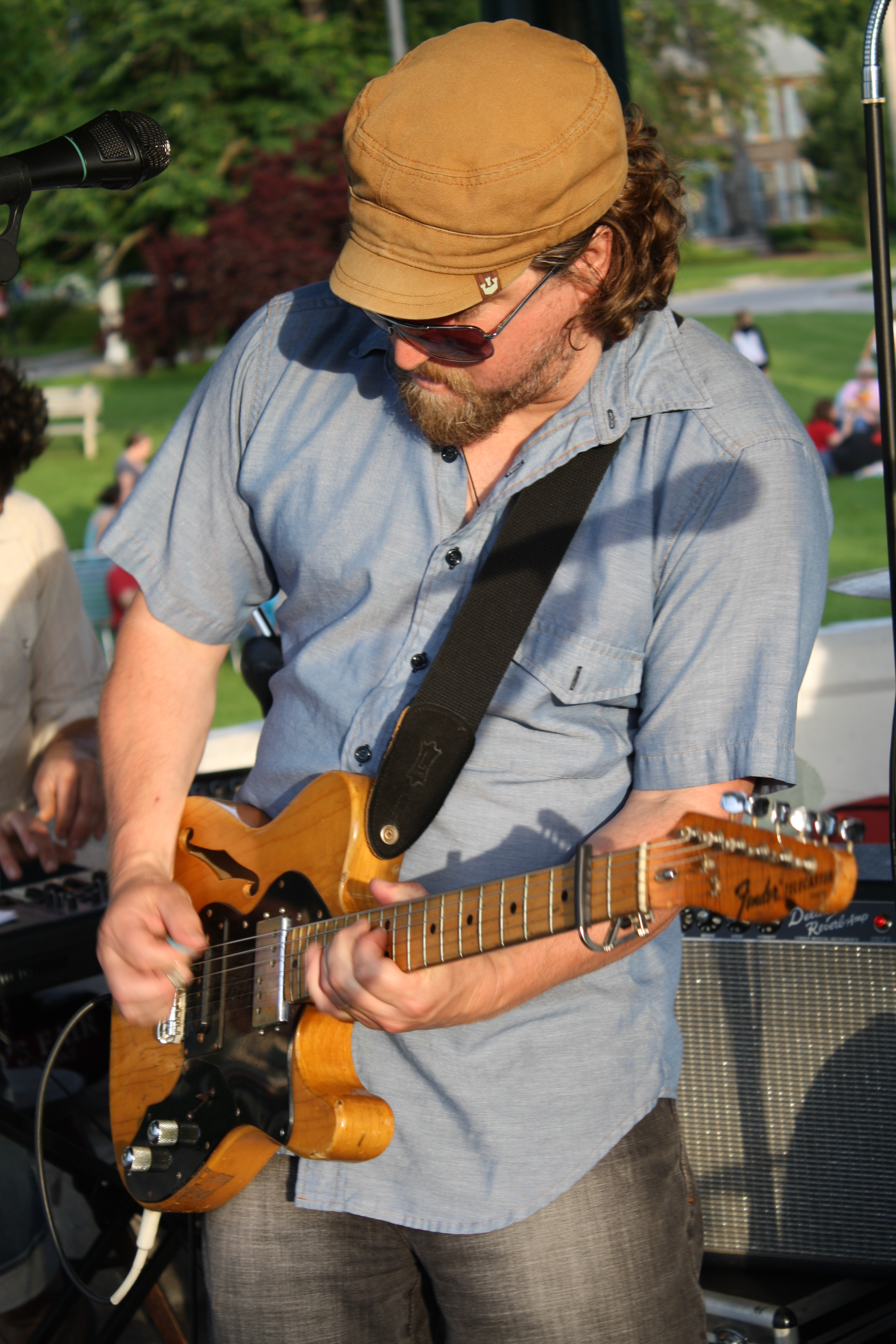
- Thayer in 2009

Background information
- Born: William Bowman Thayer; Boston, Massachusetts
- Origin: United States
- Genres: Americana; Bluegrass; Country; Folk; Rock
- Occupations: Banjoist; Guitarist; Multi-string Instrumentalist; Songwriter
- Instruments: Banjo; Guitar
- Years active: 1990–present
- Labels: Big House Publishing
- Website: www.bowthayer.com

Bow Thayer is an American songwriter, guitarist, and banjoist and the founder of the Tweed River Music Festival.

His career spans over two decades with bands including the 7 League Boots, Elbow, Jethro and The Benders as well as solo work.

== Career ==
=== Seven League Boots ===
Founded in 1990, the Seven League Boots included Bow Thayer, Bobby Sullivan, bassist Richard Feins, and drummer and vocalist Mike Press. The group hailed from Hingham, Massachusetts and formed in Boston. In 1990 and 1991, they pressed multiple singles to 7” vinyl before releasing their first and only LP, 12 Songs, on Constant Change. The group toured for three years, sharing the stage with bands including Fugazi, The Mighty Mighty Bosstones, Redd Kross, The Buck Pets, The Lemonheads, Buffalo Tom, and Beck. They also were known to influence Rage Against the Machine, and Pearl Jam was an opener in its early days. The group disbanded in the mid-1990s but played a reunion show at the Tweed River Music Festival in 2012.

=== Elbow and Jethro ===
Following 7 League Boots, Thayer formed the band Elbow. Elbow was composed of Thayer on guitar, banjo and vocals, bassist and vocalist Jeremy Moses Curtis and drummer Michael Press. The group released 3 records and frequented both the Boston and New York circuits. The band’s sound was characteristic of the minimalist approach of the electric blues overhaul and was based around slide guitar and a trash-can drumset. During the same period of time, Thayer was also a part of Jethro, playing banjo and singing lead vocals. Also in the band were frequent collaborator Jeremy Moses Curtis on acoustic guitar, Danielle Demarse on bass and vocals and Sean Staples on mandolin. The group combined Thayer’s pop-structured songs with the aesthetic of bluegrass. Both groups eventually moved to Vermont.

=== The Benders ===
Thayer returned to the Boston area frequently to play with The Benders. With Thayer, guitarist Jabe Beyer, and bassist Nolan McKelvey as the chief songwriters, the group also included Sean Staples on mandolin, and Tim Kelly on dobro. The Benders were a classic bluegrass outfit and built a following locally. The Benders were known for their original and unique take on string band music while using a traditional recording style, where the five players arranged in an arc around two microphones when recording. The debut self-titled record was released in 2001, followed by The Benders II in 2002, and the studio recording Mountain Radio in 2003. The latter two releases were on Pig Pile Records.

=== Bow Thayer and Perfect Trainwreck ===
After his work with The Benders, Bow Thayer formed his solo project, Bow Thayer and Perfect Trainwreck. The group included Thayer on guitar, banjo and lead vocals, James Rohr on piano and organ, Jeff Berlin on drums, Steve Mayone on guitar (later replaced by Chris McGandy on pedal steel) and Jeremy Moses Curtis on bass and vocals. The group recorded three studio albums and one live album. The group’s self-titled debut was released March 1, 2008, at Levon Helm Studios in Woodstock, NY, engineered by Grammy-award winning Justin Guip. Bottom Of The Sky was released November 12, 2010, and was also recorded at Levon Helm Studios and co-produced, engineered and mixed by Justin Guip. In November 2010, the group had the opportunity to play as the backing band for “Imagine There’s No Hunger” at the Hard Rock Café Hollywood, benefiting Why Hunger. Featured performances included Edgar Winter, Dave Stewart, Booker T. Jones and Ringo Starr. In April 2012, Bow Thayer and Perfect Trainwreck won Boston’s Rock’n’Roll Rumble at T.T. the Bear's Place in Cambridge. Their third studio album, Eden, was released on March 5, 2013, and was well received both locally and nationally.American Songwriter praised the record, saying “In a different era, Bow Thayer and Perfect Trainwreck would have some well-deserved gold records on their walls.” Prior to the release of Eden, Thayer and Perfect Trainwreck performed the record to the sold-out Chandler Music Hall in Randolph, VT on January 19, 2013. On Earth Day, April 22, 2014, Eden: Live at the Chandler was released as the group’s fourth full length and first live album. The album represents both the first live performance of Eden and one of the group’s last performances.

=== Work with Levon Helm ===
While recording in Boston in 2005, Thayer mentioned offhand the desire to bring a Levon Helm-inspired feel to his current recording. Session engineer/guitar player Dave Rizzuti had just worked with Helm, and introduced the two. They connected instantly upon meeting and in the studio, and began recording together. Thayer’s record Spend It All (featuring Levon Helm) was released November 1, 2006, and features the successful single Bow Thayer and Perfect Trainwreck performed at seven of Helm’s Midnight Ramble’s, including the 100th Ramble on July 5, 2008.

=== Other Solo Work ===
Other solo recordings by Bow Thayer include The Driftwood Periodicals Vol I released May 1, 2004, and Vol II released October 1, 2008, Maintenance for Mood Swings released September 1, 2006, and Shooting Arrows At The Moon released November 1, 2009. Hindsight, released August 7, 2012, is a compilation of Bow’s work from Elbow, Jethro, The Benders and The Perfect Trainwreck.

=== The Bojotar Years ===
In 2014, Thayer released a new album of progressive mountain music written and performed entirely using his acoustic and electric Bojotar instruments. Sundowser, featuring guest performances by Marco Benevento and Tracy Bonham, was described by American Song Writer as "Think of a jam between Dave Matthews, Frank Zappa and The Band – with a cameo from Bela Fleck – and you almost get the effect: virtuosic complexities from a remarkable instrumentalist." In 2016, with his drummer Jeff Berlin recovering from a series of strokes, Bow released The Source and the Servant, a collection of traditional folk and delta blues songs that were inspired, performed by and/or written by Dock Boggs and Mississippi Fred McDowell.

== Customized Instruments ==
Bow cites Mark Sandman, lead singer and bass player of Morphine, as a chief inspiration in his creation of customized instruments. Sandman was known for his signature 2 string slide bass. Morphine’s saxophonist, Dana Colley has also played on many of Thayer’s solo records. Thayer has built a number of customized guitars and banjos. One of his creations combines an acoustic guitar, resonator guitar and banjo. The instrument has a chambered guitar body with a resonator and two pickups - a humbucker by the neck and a Piezo under the resonator's biscuit. The low E string of the guitar has been replaced by the drone string of a banjo at the 5th fret. Called the Bojotar, it went into production by Eastwood Guitars in fall 2014.

== Tweed River Music Festival ==
Bow Thayer is the founder and co-partner with Jeremy Moses Curtis of the Tweed River Music Festival. The festival was held over the course of three days in Thayer’s hometown of Stockbridge, VT until its finale, "Tweed Gone Mad," that was held on larger grounds along the Mad River in Waitsfield, VT. In addition to Bow, Lydia Loveless, Christopher Paul Stelling, Joe Fletcher, Caitlyn Canty and No Small Children among many others performed. The festival has closed to allow Bow and Jeremy to spend more time on their music and with their families. Beginning as a gathering of friends for Fourth of July, the festival became a pilgrimage for grass roots music in the Green Mountains of Vermont, with nearly all of the 1,000 attendees camping on-site .

In 2011, a “Tweed River Music Festival: A Documentary” was shot and produced by Grey Sky Films and said to be “a snapshot of the greatest weekend you will ever have." It was awarded the Silver Award for Best Documentary at the 2013 Cinerockom International Film Festival in Beverly Hills, CA.
