= Live at the Middle East =

Live at the Middle East may refer to:

- Live at the Middle East (Mr. Lif), a 2002 live album by Mr. Lif
- Live at the Middle East, a 2004 live album by Minibosses
- Live at the Middle East, a 2005 live EP by Doomriders

== See also ==
- Live from the Middle East, a 1998 live album by The Mighty Mighty Bosstones
