= The Stompers (band) =

American rock band

- Origin: East Boston, Massachusetts, United States
- Genres: Rock
- Years active: 1977–2021
- Members: Sal Baglio, Stephen Gilligan, Dave Friedman, Jeremy Brown, Dave Fox
- Past members: Mark Cuccinello, Lenny Shea

The Stompers were an American rock band formed in East Boston, Massachusetts, in 1977. The group formed after lead vocalist, guitarist, and songwriter Sal Baglio and drummer Mark Cuccinello were joined by Stephen Gilligan on bass, and Dave Friedman on keyboards. On November 7, 1977, the band played their first show in Beverly, Massachusetts.

== History ==
The Stompers played in Boston-area bars such as The Rathskeller and Jonathan Swift's. The group released its first vinyl single in 1978, Coast to Coast/I'm in Trouble, on Double Eagle Records, owned by their manager, Peter Lembo. The song was later used in the John Sayles movie Return of the Secaucus 7.

On January 3, 1979, the band became one of the first unsigned acts to perform at the Paradise Rock Club in Boston. The group was asked to appear at a return engagement. Boston-based radio station WCOZ featured The Stompers on a compilation called Best of Boston Beat Volume 1 with the group's song "This is Rock n Roll".

In 1980, The Stompers toured with The Beach Boys and The J. Geils Band. The following year, the song Shutdown was featured on a second WCOZ compilation, Best of Boston Beat Volume 2. On October 6, 1982, at a press reception at Boston's Paradise Rock Club, the Stompers announced they finally landed their long-rumored contract with Boardwalk Records.

The single, the Baglio-penned "Never Tell an Angel (When Your Heart's on Fire)", was released on the Boardwalk label and spent four weeks on the Billboard Hot 100, peaking at number 88 in July 1983.

In July 1983, Cuccinello left the group, was replaced by drummer Lenny Shea, and pianist Jeremy Brown also joined the band.

In 1987, the band's tenth anniversary concert was played at The Channel in Boston. It was featured in the documentary Live Your Dreams for Real. In 1990, The Stompers released a collection of previously unreleased material, Unfinished Business, on Fast Track Records. The Stompers continued to perform live, including a show on City Hall Plaza in Boston, and released 1994's Greatest Hits...Live.

In 2000, the band's long-running lineup of Baglio, Gilligan, Friedman, Shea, and Brown, reunited and released the 21-song compilation Record Album. The following year, the group released two more albums, The Stompers (containing original 1982 studio recordings) and Live Scrapbook 1979-1983. In 2009, STOMPILATION was released, a compilation of recordings from 1983-1985.

The Stompers broke up in 2021 and Baglio decided to focus on projects like The Amplifier Heads and The Peppermint Kicks and albums with icons from the Boston music scene.
