= Quiet Desperation =

Quiet Desperation may refer to:

- "Quiet Desperation", a song by Marilyn Martin from This Is Serious, 1988
- "Quiet Desperation", a song by Scatman John from Scatman's World, 1995
- Quiet Desperation, an online mockumentary series by Rob Potylo
