= The Grownup Noise =

- Origin: Boston, Massachusetts
- Genres: Americana, indie rock
- Years active: 2005–present
- Label: Independent
- Members: Paul Hansen; Kyle Crane; Katie Franich; Adam Sankowski
- Past members: Rachel Barringer; Attis Clopton; Aine Fujioka; Rachel Gawell; Todd Marston; Dave Middleton; Yuriana Sobrino; Max Weinstein
- Website: www.thegrownupnoise.com

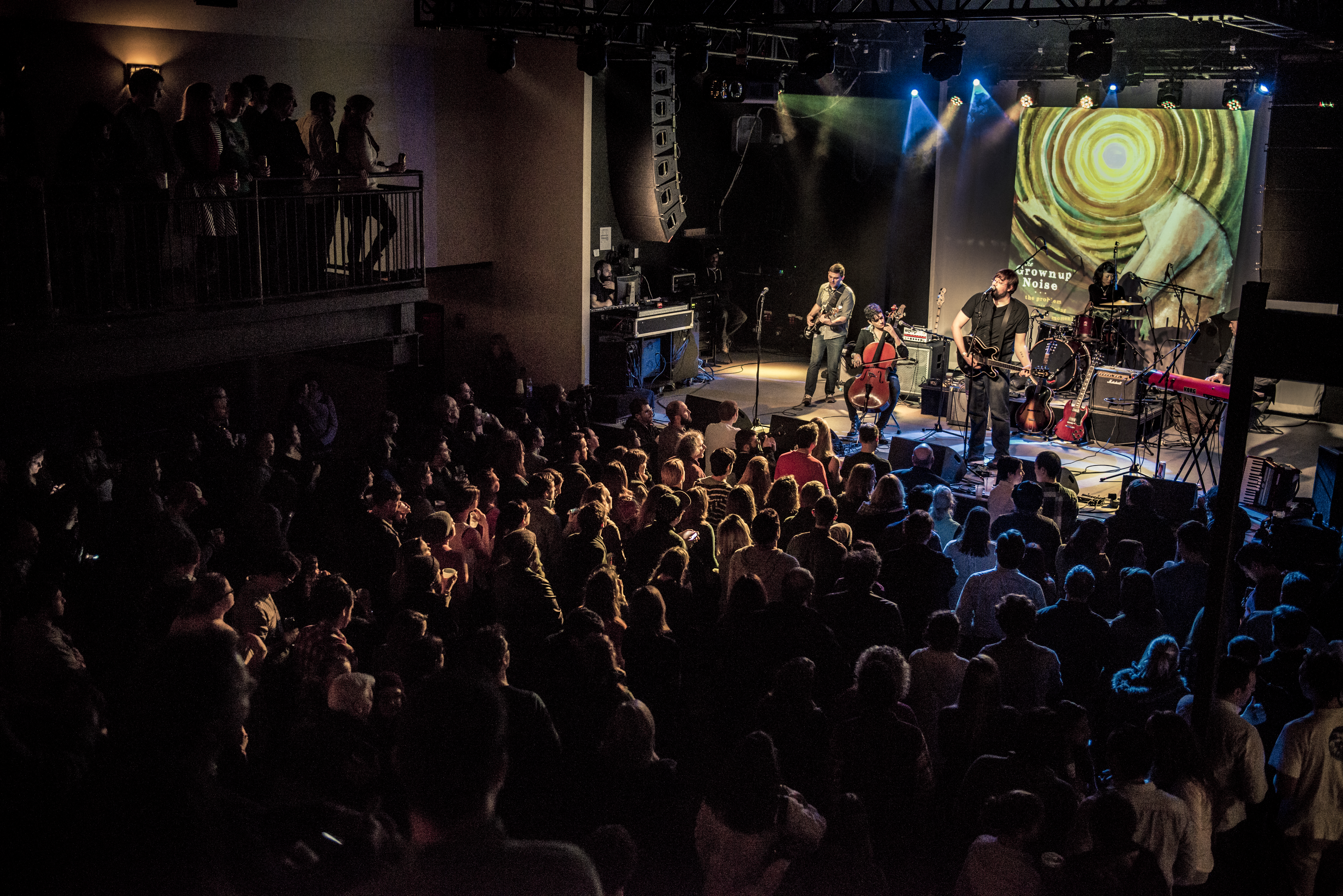
The Grownup Noise playing at Sinclair in Cambridge, MA on January 30, 2015. Photograph by Amy Lithimane.

The Grownup Noise is an American indie-folk rock band from Boston, Massachusetts, that was formed in 2005 by songwriter / guitarist Paul Hansen and bassist Adam Sankowski. Known for their songwriting and attempts to bridge the gap between Americana and indie music, their music has been difficult to define. The A.V. Club wrote in August 2009 that “The Grownup Noise’s best asset however, is the songwriting, with lines of love and the changing seasons coming out as gently and colorful as the music itself."

People often ask about the meaning of the name. The band views "The Grownup Noise" as something to rebel against, like fear, complacency, the closing of your heart, the stress of money etc.

== History ==
Based on the songwriting of Paul Hansen and the collaborative arrangements of the band, The Grownup Noise released its self-titled debut in 2007. Along with Paul Hansen and Adam Sankowski, original members included Kyle Crane on drums, Katie Franich on cello, and Todd Marston on accordion and keyboards. Using strings and accordion for rhythmic texture and blending synthesizers were part of the band's attempt to experiment, with the top priority being to serve the song's lyrics. After numerous sold-out shows including the now defunct, Paradise Lounge in Boston, the band began to tour regionally and then nationally. On their first national tour in the summer of 2008, they made it out to the West Coast in their Ford Windstar mini-van (the mini-van depicted on their first T-shirt) to play L.A.’s famed Viper Room. On that tour they performed at NYC’s The Bitter End and Nashville’s The Basement. In the spring they had performed at the Somerville Theatre with The Walsh Brothers, opening for comedian Patton Oswalt, and later that year they opened a show at the Brattle Theatre for Amanda Palmer of the Dresden Dolls. In the spring of 2009, their song ‘The Oldest Running Feature’ was featured prominently during a segment of MTV’s The Real World: Brooklyn in which now Iraq war veteran Ryan Conklin read goodbye letters days before his deployment to Iraq.

== Veggie-Oil Powered Tour Van ==
In 2008 the band purchased a 1980s Ford Econoline van and converted it to run on recycled vegetable oil. Affectionately named Lorain, this van carried the band to California and back during a summer of extremely high gas prices for zero cost. Although the band has been quick to explain the labor that was involved, such as convincing restaurant owners to let them raid grease traps and the mess of hand-filtering, all the while trying to get to shows on time. During this time drummer Attis Clopton toured with band. Lorain eventually began to experience mechanical problems and also a veggie-oil leak mid-tour on the west coast. The veggie oil leak took up two days of the tour, and among many things involved a police chase, 100 pounds of kitty litter to clean up, poison oak, an unrelated witnessing of a hit and run, and a drive from Portland, OR to Santa Cruz, CA overnight to make a show. The entire story is included in the book ‘Another Nightmare Gig From Hell’ in 2012.

== Touring and recording ==
Over the next several years the band ventured out on eight national tours, most of them organized and booked independently by Sankowski. On these tours, the band played many notable clubs including Schuba's in Chicago, The Mint in L.A., Communion in NYC, and Hi-Dive in Denver. Reviews from the tour included Good Times Paper in Santa Cruz, “At a time when pop has become most people’s guilty pleasure, it is as refreshing as it is rare to find a band that is not afraid to explore the genre as innovators”, and the Tucson, AZ Weekly “Boston's The Grownup Noise are anything but noisy. For them, maturity means a contemplative focus of sound. They're a band that revels in the beauty of a simple melody delivered with minimal enhancement for maximum emotional effect—it's grown-up in its precision”. In 2010, the band provided music for the award-winning documentary film Seeking Happily Ever After.

In March 2011, The Grownup Noise released their second LP This Time With Feeling, mixed by Scott Solter, who also performed on a track. On this release, recent addition Aine Fujioka split drum duties with Kyle Crane. A review from the Boston Globe said that The Grownup Noise was “one of Boston’s most promising outfits... a sense of sincerity, wonder, and poetry beats at the heart of skewed folk-pop songs”. In April of that year, their song "Carnival" was the most downloaded song for Paste Magazine’s Songs for Haiti. "Carnival" also won a songwriting contest judged by NY Times best selling author and co-host of the podcast Dear Sugar, Steve Almond.

In 2012, the band had their first official SXSW showcase opening for Tommy Stinson of The Replacements through Green Room Music Source, led by Craig Grossman. They also performed with Lucius at the Berklee College of Music SXSW Showcase that year, and opened for Young@Heart in Northampton, MA. During this time the band transitioned from Katie Franich to Rachel Barringer on cello. In April 2012, they were featured as the ceremonial, non-competing guest band at the Boston Rock 'n' Roll Rumble. And in December the band covered Slow Runner's ‘Break Your Mama’s Back’ for the special re-issue of SR's album No Disassemble.

In 2013, the band toured the Midwest with Golden Bloom, and Timmy Williams of The Whitest Kids U' Know. They also performed at the American Repertory Theater ‘Kick-ass Art Party’ on May 28 at Oberon with 100% of proceeds going to the One Fund to benefit victims of the Boston Marathon bombing. In spring 2013, their song "the same the same" was featured on the MTV documentary show World of Jenks and the band toured the west coast including stops at L.A.’s Silver Lake Lounge.

The band began recording a new album in 2014, which would feature all of the previous band members and Dave Middleton on pedal steel and vox. Nicknamed the family album, The Problem With Living in the Moment was released on October 4, mixed by Sam Kassirer (Josh Ritter, Lake Street Dive). At this time the band began working with long time Letters To Cleo manager Michael Creamer. Before their release show, the band performed at the ‘Sound of Our Town Boston’ featuring Aimee Mann and Ted Leo’s The Both at Boston’s The Lawn on D. On October 25th they opened for The Counting Crows at the Bowery Electric as part of the Outlaw Roadshow in NYC, put on by Ryan Spaulding and Adam Duritz. Rob Ross of popdose.com wrote that 'The Problem With Living in the Moment' was “quite an impressive gathering of songs... hopefully, people will take notice from the sounds made by The Grownup Noise on this third album”. In the fall of 2014 the band toured with Winterpills and performed at the Mercury Lounge in NYC. In 2014 and 2015, the band was nominated by the New England Music Awards for ‘Best Band in Massachusetts.

On January 30, 2015 The Grownup Noise, with fellow Boston band Kingsley Flood, sold-out the Sinclair in Cambridge. On July 8th, the band performed at the TT the Bears farewell show with Evan Dando and many other notable Boston bands such as The Pixies and Mighty Mighty Bosstones. Also in the winter of 2015, the band recorded their 4th full-length album ‘Stewing’. Hansen has stated that it was written entirely during the extreme winter of 2014-2015 and the music and lyrics reflect the claustrophobic feeling the city experienced. ‘Stewing’ was released August 14, also mixed by Sam Kassirer. The album features famed bari sax player Dana Colley from the band Morphine. Colley also performed live with The Grownup Noise at their release show at Davis Square Theatre in Somerville, MA and at The Lawn on D opening for Lee Fields and Rebirth Brass Band. In April 2015, the band performed on the international Steve Katsos Show, gaining their first credit on IMDb. Recently their song 'Make Believe', from their debut album, was featured in the 90210 reboot for Netflix at the end of the fourth episode ("The Bubble") of the first season.

After the release of ‘Stewing’, drummer Todd Marston left Boston for Oregon to pursue a master's degree, and drummer Aine Fujioka moved to Berlin. Hansen, the band's singer and songwriter, has pledged to continue writing and recording under The Grownup Noise name, but hopes to reunite the full band in the future. Jed Gottlieb of the Boston Herald wrote this about ‘Stewing’, “’Food Trucks’ drips out casually on a keyboard, then Hansen's dark, smart lyrics turn the ditty into a tale of love vs. freedom, commitment vs. imprisonment... I'm sorry to see to key members go, but I say fill the vacancy and make a new album for 2016.”

Paul Hansen joined with cellist, Rachel Gawell, and drummer, Yuriana Sobrino, to form a new trio version of The Grownup Noise in April of 2016. The popular Boston media group, Vanyaland, covered the trio ahead of their Atwood's Tavern show in Cambridge, MA. Gawell was the original cellist for Ballroom Thieves, while Sobrino is known among the city’s jazz and Latin scenes. “The band is only three people now, but with a lot of firepower,” Hansen told Vanyaland, “The stage show feels like it’s higher energy, we’re playing a batch of new songs and also new interpretations of old Grownup Noise tunes."

In September 2016, The Outlaw Roadshow curated by Ryan Spaulding and Adam Duritz of Counting Crows added The Grownup Noise's version of Slow Runner's 'Break Your Mama's Back' to a compilation benefit project to help pay the medical bills of a long-time fan recently diagnosed with stage 4 cancer.

In 2017, their music was used as the score for the independent, award-winning film Sundown by Brendan Boogie.

In November 2024, the original line-up of Paul Hansen, Adam Sankowski, Katie Franich, and Kyle Crane reunited, with Paul sharing, "Thank the universe for music/art. Some exciting announcements coming soon on what we believe to be our best The Grownup Noise album yet."

In April 2025, the band launched a Kickstarter to fund their new album, "No Straight Line in the Universe," that was fully funded in May 2025. The album is due out in February 2026.

== Discography ==
- The Grownup Noise (self-titled) (2005)
- This Time with Feeling (2011)
- The Problem with Living in the Moment (2013)
- Stewing (2015)
- Lonely Days (2020)
- No Straight Line in the Universe (2026)
