= Oranjuly =

- Origin: Boston, Massachusetts
- Genres: Pop, rock
- Years active: 2008–2012
- Past members: Brian E. King; Matthew Girard; Lou Paniccia
- Website: www.oranjuly.com

Oranjuly was an American alternative rock band based in Boston, Massachusetts founded in 2008 by American songwriter Brian E. King (singer/multi-instrumentalist). Their sound has been described by music journalists as a mix of Weezer and The Beach Boys because of their catchy songwriting, intricate arrangements and heavy usage of vocal harmonies. The name Oranjuly is a combination of King's favorite color and birth month.

Oranjuly's self-titled album was released on July 2, 2010, during a show at The Middle East. Songs for the album were written and recorded by King over several years since his first songwriting sessions in 2005.

== Members ==
Though King recorded Oranjuly's songs himself, he recruited other Boston-based musicians to play live shows and occasionally record.

- Brian E. King - songs/arrangements/recordings, vocals, guitar, keys
- Lou Paniccia - drums
- Matt Girard - bass & guitar

== Discography ==
- Oranjuly (2010)
