= Spoken Portrait =

EP by Cionico
- Released: January 7, 2025
- Recorded: 2005, 2011–2021, 2023–2024
- Studio: BPQ Studios (Miami, Florida); Leo's Rodeo Studio (Orlando, Florida); Bopnique Studios (North Chelmsford, Massachusetts); Various studios from No Hay Espacio En El Cielo sessions
- Genres: Rock; Electronica
- Length: 19:31
- Label: cionicor3cords
- Producers: Bob St. John; Anthony J. Resta

Cionico chronology
No Hay Espacio En El Cielo (2022)	Spoken Portrait (2025)

Spoken Portrait is the debut extended play (EP) by Venezuelan–American rock band Cionico, released on 7 January 2025 through cionicor3cords. The EP features English-language versions of four songs from the band's 2022 debut album No Hay Espacio En El Cielo,along with one previously unreleased track.

== Background and recording ==
The concept for Spoken Portrait was developed during sessions for Cionico's second album at Bob St. John's BPQ Studios in Miami, Florida, in December 2023. Initially, the band planned to record four English-language versions of existing songs and a cover track, but vocalist Leo Rojo suggested including the unreleased song "Everything's Alright" instead.

Most of the EP's instrumentals were adapted from earlier No Hay Espacio En El Cielo sessions, with new English vocals recorded between 2023 and 2024.

=== "Everything's Alright" origins ===
The song "Everything's Alright" predates the band's official formation. It was originally recorded in 2005 at Bopnique Studios in North Chelmsford, Massachusetts, with producer Anthony J. Resta, and represents some of the earliest material linked to the Cionico project.

== Album concept and artwork ==
The EP maintains electronic-rock hybrid style while introducing English lyrics for the first time. It has been described as both a reinterpretation of their Spanish-language debut and a bridge toward future English-language releases.

The cover artwork features a collage of the band members' faces, intended to reflect the collaborative nature of the project and the group's effort in adapting their material for English-speaking audiences.

== Release and reception ==
Spoken Portrait was released on 7 January 2025 through cionicor3cords. Critics praised its production quality, as well as the band's successful transition to English-language material.

== Track listing ==
All tracks written by Oscar Balza

#	Title	Length	Notes
1	"Higher"	4:07	English version of "Extraño"
2	"All of Me"	3:14	English version of "Todo"
3	"Everything's Alright"	3:36	Previously unreleased; produced by Anthony J. Resta
4	"I'll Wait"	4:00	English version of "Esperaré"
5	"Miss You"	4:35	English version of "Vida"

== Personnel ==
=== Cionico ===
- Leo Rojo – lead vocals, guitar solo ("Higher," "Miss You")
- Oscar Balza – drums, background vocals, acoustic guitar
- Wade Torres – guitars
- Gerardo Pérez Giusti – bass, keyboards, background vocals

=== Additional musicians ===
- Edward Bradley – bass ("All of Me")
- Delvis Luna – guitars ("Higher")
- Kike Ferrer – guitars, synthesizers ("All of Me," "Miss You")
- Jose "Chucho" Duque – guitars ("Miss You")
- Russell Mufsky – guitars ("Everything's Alright")
- Mike Roberts – bass ("Everything's Alright")
- Paul Bettencourt – background vocals ("I'll Wait")

=== Production ===
- Bob St. John – producer, mixing, mastering
- Anthony J. Resta – producer ("Everything's Alright"), background vocals, guitars, synthesizers, programming ("Everything's Alright")
