= Man Ray (disambiguation) =

Man Ray was an American Dada and surrealist artist.

Man Ray may also refer to:

- Man Ray (SpongeBob SquarePants), a villain in the animated television series SpongeBob SquarePants
- Man Ray (bar), a restaurant-bar in Paris, France
- Man Ray, the name of the dog photographed repeatedly by photographer William Wegman
- "Man Ray," a song by The Futureheads from their 2004 album The Futureheads
- Manray, a nightclub in Cambridge, Massachusetts, U.S.
- Manray, a character played by tap dancer Savion Glover in the 2000 movie Bamboozled
- Man Ray, an Argentine rock duo of singer Hilda Lizarazu and guitarist Tito Losavio
- Ray Fillet, originally called Man Ray, a character from the Teenage Mutant Ninja Turtles franchise
