= La Peste (band) =

American punk band

- Origin: Boston, Massachusetts, U.S.
- Genres: Punk rock
- Years active: 1976–1982
- Labels: Black Records, Smash Easy, Wharf Cat
- Past members: Peter Dayton, Roger Tripp, Mark Andreasson, Ian Kalinosky

La Peste was a Boston-based punk rock band formed in 1976 by Peter Dayton (guitar and vocals), Roger Tripp (drums), and Mark Karl (bass). The band's name is French for "the plague"; Dayton named the band after the novel of the same name by Albert Camus. La Peste released one and a half singles during their original run, "Better Off Dead / Black", on Black Records, and "Computer Love", split with Lord Manuel and The Neighborhoods. Subway News stated "outside of Willie Alexander, they [had] the Boston underground's most distinctive and peculiar sound". La Peste disbanded in 1982 after Dayton left in 1979.

== History ==
The band formed in 1976 with Peter Dayton (guitar and vocals), Roger Tripp (drums), and Mark Andreasson (bass) after Dayton heard a Ramones concert at CBGB. According to a retrospective article in The Boston Globe, no one could play the instruments they chose for the band, as Dayton and Andreasson played drums and Tripp played the flute. Andreasson adopted the name "Mark Karl" while in the band, named after his grandfather. La Peste's name is French for "the plague"; Dayton named the band after the novel of the same name by Albert Camus.

In 1978, Black Records released La Peste's debut single, "Better Off Dead / Black". The band had a catalogue of fifty original songs.

At one point, they served as the warm-up act for the Ramones and The Damned, and recorded a four-song demo with Ric Ocasek in February 1979. "Computer Love", split with Lord Manuel and The Neighborhoods, was released as a single in 1979. La Peste placed second in Boston's first annual Rock 'n' Roll Rumble in June that year, losing to The Neighborhoods. Dayton left the band in 1979, after which Tripp and Andreasson recruited Ian Kalinosky, who took the stage name Ian Blast, to play guitar. La Peste ultimately disbanded in 1982.

Subway News stated "outside of Willie Alexander, they [had] the Boston underground's most distinctive and peculiar sound". In a review of the band's 1996 CD release Peste on Matador Records, which consisted of demos and live material, author Dave Thompson stated "if Brian Eno was a jittery rock three piece, Tiger Mountain might have sounded a lot like this". Smash Easy released V. 2.0 in 2004, which comprised post-Dayton (Kalinosky) material.

AllMusic reviewer Joe Viglione praised 2.0 as "[doing] creatively what only the post-Diana Ross Supremes pulled off: they were able to continue the sound and spirit of what was originally created with a highly talented and magnetic character who decided to move on". In 2026, Wharf Cat released I Don’t Know Right From Wrong: Lost La Peste 1976–1979, Vol. 1, a collection of their music. Eric R. Danton of Pitchfork described the release as helping to "put into context the vibrant Boston alt-rock scene that blossomed in the '80s, slotting into Boston’s underground timeline a missing link between the Modern Lovers and Mission of Burma".
