= No Hay Espacio en el Cielo =

Studio album by Cionico
- Released: November 11, 2022
- Recorded: 2011–2021
- Studio: Multiple (Venezuela, United States)
- Genre: Rock, electronica, ambient
- Length: 45:48
- Label: Cionico R3cords
- Producer: Oscar Balza, Carlos Quintero (early sessions)

No Hay Espacio en el Cielo is the debut studio album by Venezuelan–American rock band Cionico, released on 11 November 2022 through Cionico R3cords. The album blends rock, electronica, and ambient elements and was recorded over a period of ten years in multiple studios across Venezuela and the United States. It received coverage in Latin American music outlets including Rolling Stone en Español and Rugidos Disidentes.

== Background and recording ==
The album's conception began in 2011 following the deaths of several people close to drummer and primary songwriter Oscar Balza. The project was influenced by Venezuela's high crime rates during the Hugo Chávez presidency, when over 120,000 people were reported killed due to violent crime. The title track and album name ( No hay espacio en el cielo ) were inspired by newspaper coverage of overcrowded morgues in Caracas, particularly at the Bello Monte morgue facility.

=== Production challenges (2011–2018) ===
Recording began in 2011 under the direction of Oscar Balza and co-producer Carlos Quintero but was soon delayed by scheduling conflicts and financial setbacks, leaving the project inactive through 2012–2013. In 2013, sessions resumed with vocalist Julio Serra, though Venezuela's energy crisis caused frequent blackouts that disrupted work. To avoid interruptions, vocals were recorded at Backstage Studios in Valencia, while drums were tracked at Leo Partipillo's facilities. Further delays occurred and by 2015, the worsening conditions in Venezuela led him to relocate to the United States, pausing production once again.

=== Completion in the United States (2018–2021) ===
The project was revived in 2018 at Beltway Studios in Houston, with Roberto Rincón engineering new drum and piano sessions. After Serra's departure, vocalist Diego Scarpelli joined in 2019, with final vocals recorded in Cambridge, Massachusetts. The album was mixed and mastered by Bob St. John, concluding production in 2021.

== Release and promotion ==
The album was preceded by seven singles released between 2019 and 2021:

- "Esperaré" (25 September 2019)
- "Todo" (8 November 2019)
- "Roca y Coral" (31 March 2020)
- "Diplomático" (18 May 2020)
- "No Hay Espacio en el Cielo" (28 October 2020)
- "Bocados" (28 December 2020)
- "Extraño" (30 July 2021)

Cionico performed their first live show in November 2019 at The Middle East nightclub in Boston. The COVID-19 pandemic impacted subsequent promotional activities, with the band focusing on music video production during lockdowns.

The full album was released on 11 November 2022. Promotion included music videos and regional touring in South America.

== Album concept and artwork ==
The album blends rock with electronic and ambient elements. The album addresses themes of grief, family dynamics, romantic relationships, and social violence in Venezuela. Songs such as "Todo" and "Roca y Coral" explore personal relationships, while "Vida" and "Hoy" deal with loss and acceptance. The instrumental closing track, "Orchids", incorporates ambient field recordings and orchestral elements.

The title No Hay Espacio en el Cielo ("There's No Space in Heaven") serves as both a literal reference to the overcrowded morgues that inspired the concept and a metaphorical statement about loss, grief, and the feeling that even divine spaces cannot accommodate the magnitude of suffering experienced during the album's creation period.

== Critical reception ==
No Hay Espacio en el Cielo received favorable reviews from Latin American media. Rolling Stone en Español described the release as a significant debut for Cionico, while Rugidos Disidentes highlighted its bilingual approach and fusion of rock and electronic textures.

== Track listing ==
All tracks written by Oscar Balza.

Track listing
No.	Title	Length	Credits
1	"Bocados"	3:55	Lead vocals: Diego Scarpelli · Background vocals: Oscar Balza, Leah Dodd · Guitars: Carlos Quintero, Delvis Luna, Wade Torres · Drums: Oscar Balza · Synths & programming: Carlos Quintero, Oscar Balza
2	"Diplomático"	3:29	Lead vocals: Diego Scarpelli · Background vocals: Oscar Balza, Jean Carlo De Oliveira, Julio Serra · Guitars: Carlos Quintero · Guitar solo: Leonardo Rojo · Drums: Oscar Balza · Synths & programming: Carlos Quintero, Oscar Balza
3	"Todo"	3:12	Lead vocals: Diego Scarpelli · Background vocals: Oscar Balza · Guitars: Carlos Quintero, Kike Ferrer, Wade Torres · Bass: Edward Bradley · Drums: Oscar Balza · Synths & programming: Carlos Quintero, Oscar Balza
4	"Roca y Coral"	4:40	Lead vocals: Diego Scarpelli · Background vocals: Oscar Balza · Piano: Oscar Balza · Guitars: Carlos Quintero · Guitar solo: Henry Arias · Acoustic guitar: Wade Torres · Bass: Gerardo Pérez Giusti · Drums: Oscar Balza · Synths & programming: Carlos Quintero, Oscar Balza
5	"No Hay Espacio en el Cielo"	3:40	Lead vocals: Diego Scarpelli · Background vocals: Oscar Balza · Guitars: Carlos Quintero · Bass: Carlos Quintero, Oscar Balza · Drums: Oscar Balza · Synths & programming: Carlos Quintero, Oscar Balza
6	"Abismo"	3:19	Lead vocals: Diego Scarpelli · Background vocals: Oscar Balza · Guitars: Carlos Quintero, Frank Mota, Jose Duque · Drums: Oscar Balza · Synths: Carlos Quintero, Jose Angel Cavallin · Programming: Carlos Quintero, Oscar Balza
7	"Extraño"	4:06	Lead vocals: Diego Scarpelli · Background vocals: Oscar Balza · Guitars: Carlos Quintero, Delvis Luna, Wade Torres · Guitar solo: Rafael Pirela · Drums: Oscar Balza · Synths & programming: Carlos Quintero, Oscar Balza
8	"Vida"	3:55	Lead vocals: Oscar Balza · Background vocals: Diego Scarpelli, Oscar Balza, Kike Ferrer · Acoustic guitar: Oscar Balza · Guitars: Jose "Chucho" Duque · Drums: Oscar Balza · Synths: Carlos Quintero, Kike Ferrer, Oscar Balza · Programming: Carlos Quintero, Oscar Balza
9	"Esperaré"	3:56	Lead vocals: Diego Scarpelli · Background vocals: Oscar Balza, Paul Bettencourt · Guitars: Carlos Quintero · Piano: Carlos Quintero · Drums: Oscar Balza · Synths & programming: Carlos Quintero, Oscar Balza
10	"No lo voy a dejar"	3:48	Lead vocals: Oscar Balza, Diego Scarpelli · Guitars: Carlos Quintero, Delvis Luna, Wade Torres · Bass: Carlos Quintero · Drums: Oscar Balza · Synths & programming: Carlos Quintero, Oscar Balza
11	"Hoy"	4:22	Lead vocals: Diego Scarpelli · Background vocals: Oscar Balza · Guitars: Carlos Quintero · Piano: Carlos Quintero · Drums: Oscar Balza · Synths & programming: Carlos Quintero, Oscar Balza
12	"Orchids"	3:26	Field recordings: Oscar Balza · Synths: Carlos Quintero, Oscar Balza · Additional sounds: glass noise, Fionna

== Personnel ==
Credits adapted from the album's liner notes.

=== Cionico ===
- Diego Scarpelli – lead vocals
- Oscar Balza – drums, vocals, acoustic guitar, piano, synthesizers, programming; production
- Wade Torres – guitar
- Gerardo Pérez Giusti – bass

=== Additional musicians ===
- Delvis Luna – guitars (tracks 1, 3, 7)
- Leonardo Rojo – guitar solo (track 5)
- Kike Ferrer – guitars, background vocals, synthesizers (tracks 2, 4)
- Edward Bradley – bass (track 9)
- Henry Arias – guitar solo (track 6)
- Frank Mota – guitars (tracks 8, 10)
- Jose "Chucho" Duque – guitars (track 11)
- Rafael Pirela – guitar solo (track 7)
- Jose Angel Cavallin – synthesizers (track 12)
- Paul Bettencourt – background vocals (track 8)
- Leah Dodd – background vocals (track 9)
- Jean Carlo De Oliveira – background vocals (track 4)
- Julio Serra – background vocals (early sessions, tracks 2, 5)

=== Production ===
- Oscar Balza – production, programming
- Carlos Quintero – co-production (early sessions)
- Roberto Rincón – recording engineer
- Bob St. John – mixing, mastering
