= Lou Miami =

American punk musician

Lou Miami (February 11, 1956 – July 25, 1995) was an American punk musician based in Boston, Massachusetts, United States. His group, The Kozmetix, was popular on the local scene and released two EPs. He combined a rough punk sound with a glam-influenced choice of clothing.

== Biography ==
=== Career ===
As was typical for many punk bands at the time, the Kozmetix regularly played at The Rathskeller, The Channel, Jonathan Swifts, Cantones, and Spit as well as New York venues such as the Peppermint Lounge, and the old Living Room in Providence, Rhode Island. Lou Miami and the Kozmetix also regularly played the Inn-Square Men's Bar in Inman Square, Cambridge, Massachusetts.

In The Kozmetix, Miami was the lead singer, Jack Rootoo played lead guitar, H.P. (a.k.a. Helen Privett) bass guitar, Dolores Paradise organ, and Laural Blanchard drums.

During the band's touring years from 1979 to 1981, the Kozmetix line-up was Miami on vocals, Rootoo guitar, Bill Norcott on bass and Melodye Chisholm (now known as Melodye Buskin) on drums. Norcott and Chisholm were previously members of Phobia. This line-up had a regular Monday night gig at Cantones for two years, as well as appearing at numerous clubs in the Boston area. The group was managed by Joan Martin. (Note: the band toured past 1981. They were regulars at the Living Room on Promenade St. in Providence, at least up until 1983.) Following the release of their first single and subsequent LP, the band's popularity spread to suburbia, and throughout 1984 the band made regular appearances at KJ's Hollywood & Vine, a venue 30 miles from either Boston or Providence.

Their first single "Fascist Lover" b/w "To Sir with Love" was sold in a white plastic cosmetics bag that mimicked a Lord & Taylor shopping bag. "Fascist Lover" contained the lyrics, "A fascist lover that made my mother, and then my mother made me." Their album Lou Miami & The Kozmetix was produced by Ann Prim and Karen Kirby, both from the Boston-based band November Group.

On their second album, Rituals, the band consisted of Miami, lead singer; Rootoo, lead guitar; H.P., bass guitar; Laurel Blanchard, drums; and Toby Ingalls, rhythm guitars. Additional musicians used were Chris Spedding and Kristi Rose.

=== Videos ===
Miami's cover version of "One Hundred Years from Today" was done in a retro style, imitating the voice and music of singers from the 1920s.

=== Deaths ===
Miami died of heart failure in Los Angeles in August 1995. Jack Rootoo (Richard J. Galvin) died of esophageal cancer in Massachusetts on June 13, 2008, at the age of 51.

== Discography ==
=== EPs ===
- Lou Miami & the Kozmetix (1982)
- Rituals (1985)

=== Singles ===
- "Fascist Lover" and "To Sir With Love"
