= Ghosts of Jupiter =

American rock band

- Origin: Boston
- Genres: Psychedelic Rock, Stoner Rock
- Years active: 2011-present
- Members: Nate Wilson - Keyboard/Vocals/Guitar; Adam Terrell - Guitar; Pierre Aleksi - Guitar; Tommy Lada - Bass; Tom Arey - Drums
- Past members: Johnny Trama - Guitar; Jason Cohen - keys
- Website: http://ghostsofjupiter.com/

Ghosts of Jupiter is a psychedelic rock band based out of the Boston area, previously known as the Nate Wilson Group. Led by former Percy Hill keyboardist Nate Wilson, the band features a loud, riff-heavy sound inspired by classic rock groups such as Led Zeppelin, Black Sabbath, and Cream. GOJ features Guitarists Adam Terrell (also of Assembly of Dust) and Pierre Aleksi (formerly of the Curtis Mayflower), while MIT graduate bassist Tommy Lada and drummer Tom Arey (also touring with J. Geils Band) hold down the band's rhythm section.

Band leader, Wilson, a New England Conservatory of Music graduate, has also worked as a freelance and session musician, appearing on stage and in the studio with artists such as Chuck Berry, John Scofield, Peter Bernstein, Stephen Perkins of Jane’s Addiction, and members of Phish and the Allman Brothers Band.

Ghosts of Jupiter’s self-titled album was released in November, 2011. With its blues inspired heavy guitar riffs, and showing fledgling signs of heading toward the psych-era rock of the late 60’s and 70’s, GoJ received positive reviews and would experience immediate success.

In the spring of 2012, Ghosts of Jupiter competed in the 23rd annual WBCN Rock & Roll Rumble .

In the fall of 2016, Ghosts of Jupiter released their sophomore album, Great Bright Horses. The ethereal vocals and playful riffs are familiar and reminiscent of the nostalgic era of classic rock.

In the spring of 2021 the band added guitarist Pierre Aleksi to their lineup. Aleksi, known for his textural guitar work with Massachusetts-based band the Curtis mayflower, has been a welcome addition to the band. In the fall of 2021, GoJ released their follow up to “Great Bright Horses” album with the astonishing “Keepers of the Newborn Green”. Working separately through the COVID-19 pandemic in 2020, it was all brought together and produced by lead vocal and pianist Nate Wilson as well as bassist Tommy Lada. It was also engineered, mixed, and mastered by Tommy Lada.

== Ghosts of Jupiter: Music Experience at the Museum of Science ==
On June 22, 2012 Ghosts of Jupiter: Music Experience premiered at the Boston Museum of Science’s Charles Haydn Planetarium. Ghosts of Jupiter: Music Experience combines the band’s eponymous album with 45 minutes of animations created exclusively for the show.

== Discography ==
- Unbound (2008), as Nate Wilson Group
- Ghosts of Jupiter (2011)
- Green Is Gold Vol. 1 (2013)
- The Great Bright Horses (2016)
- Keepers of the Newborn Green (2021)
