= This Bliss (band) =

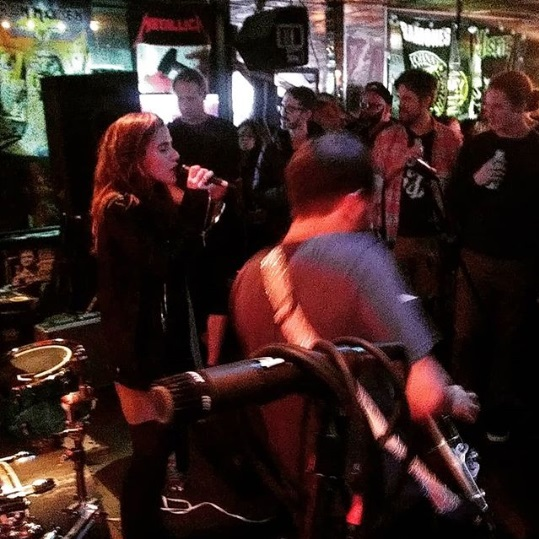
- This Bliss at Stoshs, 19 October 2018.

Background information
- Origin: Boston, Massachusetts, U.S.
- Genres: Indie, pop rock
- Years active: 2017–present
- Label: Mint 400 Records
- Members: Jess Baggia; Tom Maroon; Nick Zampiello
- Website: http://www.thisbliss.net

This Bliss is an American indie electronic band from Massachusetts.

== History ==
Singer-songwriter Jess Baggia released her debut studio EP, entitled Back in the Game, in 2009, which is described as a collection of pop compositions, with influences from roots, blues and Americana music. Baggia performed around the Greater Boston area, building a fan base, and selling out popular local music venues, before being joined by Tom Maroon and Nick Zampiello. Zampiello has won two Boston Music Awards. Originally conceived as a studio project, Baggia and Zampiello formed the band This Bliss to explore their take on electronic rock. Shortly thereafter, Maroon joined them to round out the trio. The band describes as themselves as "true grime," and they draw comparison to the music of St. Lucia and Portishead.

=== Mint 400 Records ===
In 2018, This Bliss signed with Mint 400 Records. They released their debut album Forensic Styles, described by Patch Media's Sam Bayer as "a cinematic dreamscape that explores the world of trip-hop and electronica through the lens of a crime novelist," on 18 September 2018. The album features drum machines and synthesizers, and draws inspiration from the television show Forensic Files.

The album is described as "electronic soul," and Impose calls the single "Believe" a "shimmering, whirring track engulfs you in heavy electronica in a pop style similar to CHVRCHES but more atmospheric." The track "Make it Real" features Baggia's "cool vocals slink[ing] and sway[ing] over electro beats and tremolo guitar."

== Members ==
- Jess Baggia – vocals and guitar
- Nick Zampiello – drums, sampling and synths

Former

- Tom Maroon – guitar and vocals

== Discography ==
Albums

- Forensic Styles (2018)
- Dramatization of Real Events (2019)
- Forensically Restyled (2020)
- Retroshade (2021)

Singles

- "Believe" (2018)
- "Talk Talk Talk" (2019)
- "Friend" (2021)
- "Rules" (2024)
