= Streight Angular =

Garage rock band

- Origin: Boston, Massachusetts
- Genres: Garage rock, pop, experimental
- Years active: 2008–present
- Labels: Polk Records
- Members: Yoshi Walsh; Theresa Polk

Streight Angular are a band from Boston, Massachusetts.The band has garnered significant accolades from local press including "Best Garage Rock Band" Boston Phoenix (2012), nominated "Best New Artist" and "Everyone is Syncopated" was nominated "Song of the Year" at Boston Music Awards (2012).

== Overview ==
Streight Angular (also known as StreightAngular) was founded by Yoshi Walsh and Theresa Polk when they met at party in Boston. They have gone on to play countless shows with various musicians including Andrew Mello from the band Anubis Pop. They are a two-piece but can have live shows of more than 7 performers.

The origin of the band's name was described by Yoshi in an interview with ROQ Magazine:

I was walking to work at my regular 9 to 5 job, and I realized that a lot of things were Straight and Angular in the world. Not necessarily in shapes but also in emotions, feelings, and the way that people act. Some people are very straight in their lives, they don’t take any risks or anything like that and some people get a little bit more angular. I felt like I wanted to be a little bit of both, go a little crazy, and do whatever. Just trying to find some meaning of what’s going on in this time and place right now.

== Musical style ==
Streight Angular's upbeat, intense sound is often referred to in visual terms, having been described as "colorful" "day-glo", and "neon soaked". Streight Angular has cited diverse influences including Jazz, Blues, and Baroque and Romantic classical music

== Discography ==
- After and Before (2009)
- Everyone is Syncopated EP (2012)
- Messenger of Love (2015)
