= Live at the Middle East (Mr. Lif album) =

Live album by Mr. Lif
- Released: January 22, 2002
- Genre: Hip hop
- Length: 67:41
- Label: Ozone

Mr. Lif chronology
Cro-Magnum b/w Fulcrum 12 (2001)	Live at the Middle East (2002)	Home of the Brave (2002)

Professional ratings
Review scores
Source	Rating
Allmusic	link

Live at the Middle East is a 2002 live album by underground hip-hop artist Mr. Lif. The album, released on Ozone Records, was recorded live at The Middle East Restaurant and Nightclub in Cambridge, MA. The performance includes appearances by fellow Perceptionists lyricist Akrobatik, DJ Fakts One, and guest emcees Insight and Akbar.

In addition to being a live album recorded before Mr. Lif's full-length debut I Phantom, the album is notable for the early appearance of the artist with Akrobatik as the Perceptionists, an almost 13-minute freestyle with Akrobatik, and multiple halts in the performance whenever the artist yells "Stop the record!"

== Track listing ==
1. "Intro" – 1:56
2. "Get This Paper" – 2:53
3. "Live from the Plantation" – 4:23
4. "The Fringes" – 4:15
5. "Elektro / Cro-Magnon" ( – 4:56)
6. "Stop the Record" – 2:42
7. "Be Out" – 3:31
8. "The Nothing" – 1:21
9. "Universal" (featuring Insight) – 3:27
10. "Insight Intro / Triangular Warfare" – 3:06
11. "Earthcrusher" – 3:35
12. "I Beat Ak in FIFA 98" – 2:10
13. "Inhuman Capabilities" (featuring Akrobatik) – 3:30
14. "Freestyle Session" (featuring Akbar and Akrobatik) – 12:44
15. "Deadfro" – 5:03
16. "Retrospect/Outro" – 8:10
