= Herra Terra =

US musical group

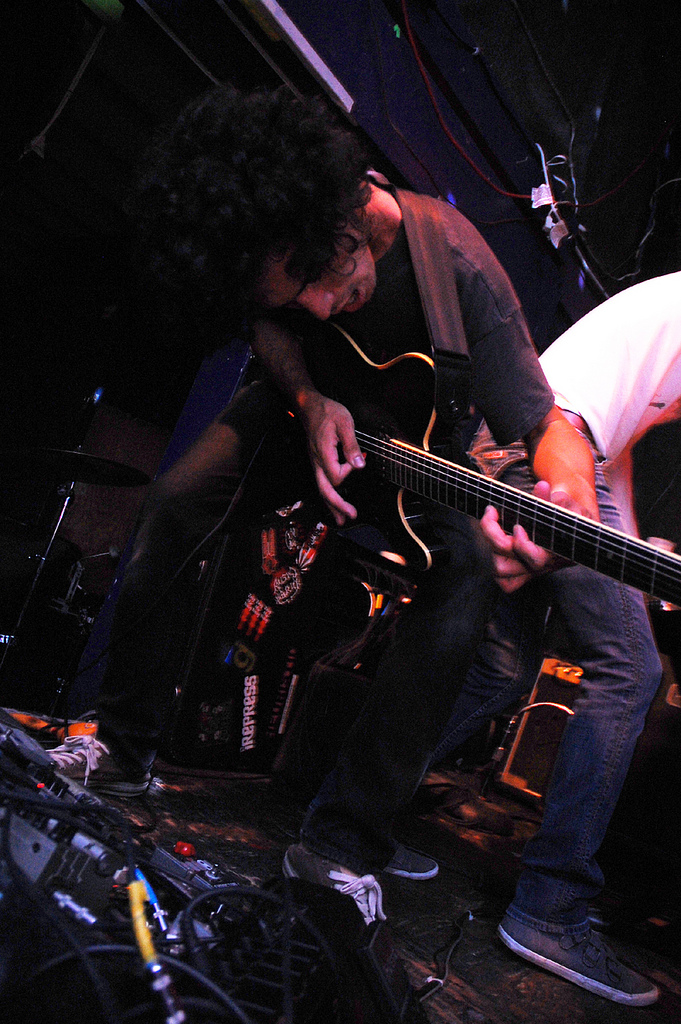
- Live in Boston 2010

Background information
- Origin: Massachusetts, USA
- Genres: Space rock Electronic rock Symphonic rock
- Years active: 2006–2015
- Labels: The Mylene Sheath
- Members: John Paul Tonelli; Gregg Kusumah-Atmadja; Shawn Pelkey/>Adrian Bettencourt Andrade
- Website: www.herraterra.com

Herra Terra is an electro-rock group from Massachusetts, signed to indie label The Mylene Sheath, currently supporting their 2010 release "Quiet Geist".

== History ==
Herra Terra was conceived by vocalist John Paul Tonelli and guitarist Gregg Kusumah-Atmadja. The duo released a 3-song EP in 2008 entitled “Organs For The Afterlife” with help from Boston-based musicians (Bad Rabbits, Irepress) and sound engineer, Mike ”Mo” Lapierre (Death Cab for Cutie, Brand New, Drop Kick Murphy's). Unable to find a permanent drummer, the band played as a two-piece electronic act in the New England area until 2009, when the band recruited Brad Caetano (Arms & Sleepers, Seneca, AM/PM). Since then, the group has melded together and enhanced their electronic and live elements, adding Adrian Bettencourt Andrade on bass.

Herra Terra has been an Official Showcasing Artist at the 2011 and 2012 SXSW Festivals.

Herra Terra has shared the stage with such artists as The White Mountains, Shiny Toy Guns, Piebald, Damone, Freeze Pop, Green Jelly, Appleseed Cast, Hot Rod Circuit, Chk Chk Chk (!!!), Bad Rabbits, Irepress, Semi Precious Weapons, and many others.

== Members ==
John Tonelli – Vocals/Keys

Gregg Kusumah-Atmadja – Guitar/Keys

Adrian Bettencourt Andrade – Bass/Keys

Shawn Pelkey – Drums
