= Rob Potylo =

American musical comedian

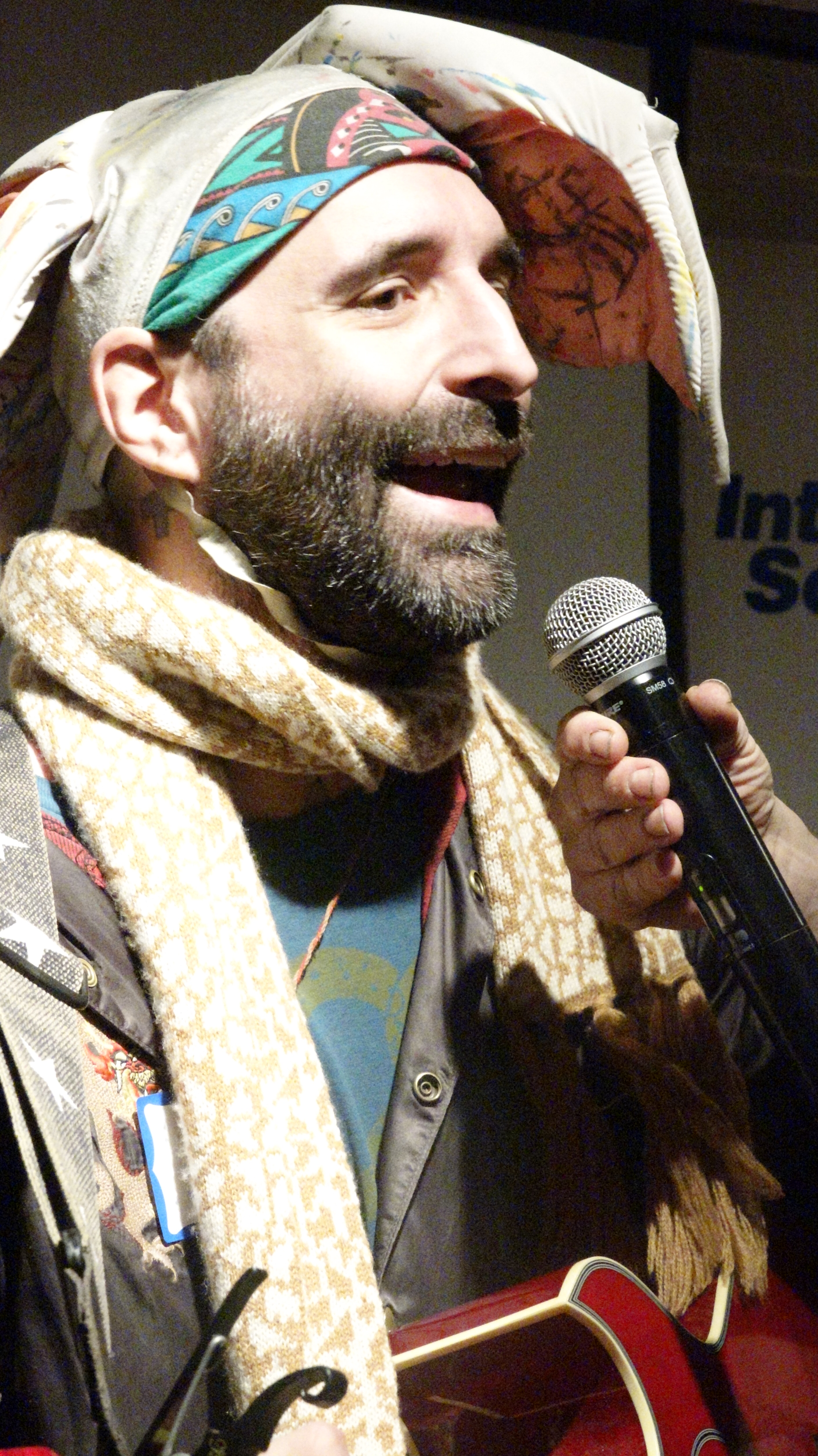
- Potylo at Wikipedia Day 2017
- Born: Louis Robert Potylo; September 3, 1976 (age 50); Salem, Massachusetts, U.S.
- Occupations: Radio personality, producer, actor, singer-songwriter, performance artist
- Known for: Robby Roadsteamer, Quiet Desperation
- Political party: Democratic

Rob Potylo (born Louis Robert Potylo; September 3, 1976) is an American performance artist, film producer, activist and musical comedian. He is best known for performing as Robby Roadsteamer, a fictional comedic persona portrayed on WBCN 104.1 FM radio in Boston for several years. The character, inspired in part by rock musicians and professional wrestling stars, would spawn the release of multiple albums and a live touring band, as well as various other miscellaneous media ventures. The character of Roadsteamer has performed parodies of various songs at various political protests.

Potylo has produced and appeared in five seasons of Quiet Desperation, a scripted online mockumentary comedy web show and cable series about the underground art and music scene.

== Early life ==

He is the son of Louis and Patricia Potylo of Danvers, Massachusetts.

== Career ==
In September 2007, Potylo appeared in an episode of a reality dating show Sox Appeal, which was broadcast on New England Sports Network (NESN). The dating show took place on the right field roof deck during a Red Sox game at Fenway Park, and saw Potylo predict a David Ortiz double during the broadcast.

At the 2009 Andy Kaufman Awards at Caroline's Comedy club in New York City, Potylo came in 2nd place at the competition. The contestants were judged by Andy Kaufman's father, his brother Michael, and Kristen Schaal.

In February 2011, Potylo teamed up with Jennifer Coolidge to sing "Happy Birthday" to Coolidge's father at the Wilbur Theatre. She also appeared in his reality series Quiet Desperation.

In 2012, Potylo collaborated with performance artist and anarchist presidential candidate Vermin Supreme. He was featured as Supreme's protege in the 2014 documentary "Who Is Vermin Supreme? An Outsider Odyssey."

In April 2014, Potylo returned to live radio with The Rob Potylo Entertainment System, a daily hot talk show produced by Rob Kaufman for the Cambridge, Massachusetts based independent podcast studio, WEMF Radio. The weekday afternoon drive program featured introspective monologues, alternative improvisational comedy segments, and appearances by local performing musicians.

In December 2014, Robby Roadsteamer returned from hiatus at The Middle East Downstairs in Cambridge, MA, resurfacing with his new "manager" WWE's The "Mouth of the South" Jimmy Hart. The two then co-created a new mockumentary series "Loud Satisfaction".

Potylo appeared on Season 1, Episode 4 of the 2017 revival of The Gong Show to perform his song "Hot Dogs And Applesauce," and encored with "Shaving Cream" by Benny Belle. He is the only contestant in the show's history to receive a SAG performer's credit through the show.

Potylo appeared on Ellen on Season 15 episode 38 the IT Haunted House at Warner Bros Studio lot in a segment with producer Andy Lassner.

=== Protest performances (2024–present) ===
Potylo heckled Steve Bannon at his first press conference after being released from prison in October 2024, days before the presidential election. Potylo introduced himself as Robby Roadsteamer, then started asking Bannon when they could get started on another insurrection, with Roadsteamer suggesting perhaps it was time to overthrow a Burger King. In the same press conference Hulk Hogan was filmed smiling wanly as Roadsteamer was speaking to him in a loud voice about perceived MAGA priorities. Robby Roadsteamer also requested that there be no political violence as he was being led out of the event.

In October 2025, he was detained by ICE while performing at a protest. He was reportedly pepper sprayed and has mentioned his intention of suing. In January 2026, he was detained by ICE a second time during a protest in Minnesota.

On October 28, 2026, at a midterm campaign rally at the Shoemaker Center at Ohio University Chillicothe in Chillicothe, Ohio, shortly after President Donald Trump began speaking, Potylo stood up and began singing "Trump went on the Jeffrey Epstein plane!" to the tune of the Village People's "Y.M.C.A.", while shouting other satirical jeers. He was escorted out of the venue by security & handed over to local police where he did not face charges.
