= T.T. the Bear's Place =

Former live music venue in Cambridge, Massachusetts

Coordinates: 42°21′48.6″N 71°6′5.9″W

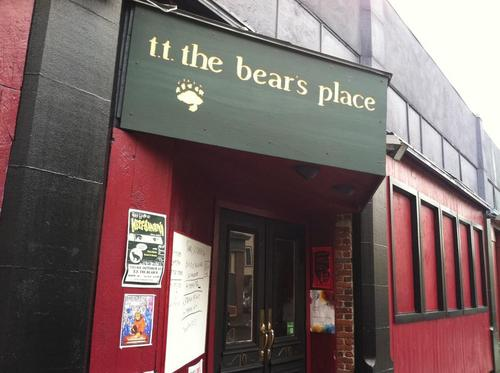
TTs

T.T. the Bear's Place (often referred to as T.T. the Bear's or, simply, TT's) was a live music venue in Central Square in Cambridge, Massachusetts that operated from 1973 until July 25, 2015.

== History ==
T.T. the Bear's began in 1973, opened by New Hampshire native, Bonney Bouley, and her boyfriend at the time, Miles Cares, as something of a dive bar, originally located on the corner of Pearl and Green Streets, around the corner from its final location. They closed it briefly in 1978, only to reopen at a new location, 10 Brookline Street, in Central Square, in 1980, originally as a restaurant; due to back taxes, Ms. Bouley filed for Chapter 11 bankruptcy, then changed the format to a full-time music club in 1984. T.T.'s helped define Central Square, along with The Middle East and, across the street, Manray.

TT's had a capacity of only 300 patrons, which contributed to its intimacy between performer and audience. The club's name originated from the need to be unique, to not have a name like any other establishment; the owners considered their own names, Miles & Bonney's; eventually they decided to name it after their pet "Teddy Bear"-style hamster, who was nicknamed Tough Teddy, hence they settled on T.T. the Bear's Place.

For 42 years, TT's was a prominent venue within the Boston music scene; it played host to both national touring acts and local bands, with 250 nights each year featuring live music. TT's celebrated its 40th anniversary in 2013. Bonney Bouley was the owner of the establishment for its entire 42-year run.

In December 2014, the building was purchased by Joseph and Nabil Sater, owners of the adjacent Middle East restaurant and music venue complex. In early 2015, the owners announced that there was to be a substantial rent increase, and a lease of five years, with an option for another five years. Ms. Bouley did not agree to the terms (she considered the rent high and the lease to be "short-term") and, without the new lease, the club could not be successfully sold to a new owner. Bouley decided in May 2015 that the club would close.

Many bands paid tribute to TT's during its final month. TT's last open night was Saturday, July 25, 2015, and the final scheduled bands on stage were O-Positive followed by Scruffy The Cat, with Dave Minehan of The Neighborhoods sitting in on vocals and guitar for the late Charlie Chesterman. Scruffy was personally chosen by Ms. Bouley to be the closing band as she had a long relationship with the band, who played her venue multiple times per year in the 1980s when she was getting started.

Bonney Bouley spoke at the finale: “The talent that is in this town and comes through this town is unbelievable. . . . It's been a wonderful journey and I hope to see you down the road." A choked-up Bouley added that she hoped the club “won't go all corporate now.” Asked what she will do next, Bouley, who resides in Dorchester, Massachusetts, said: “I'm going to take some time off to breathe." After July 15, 2015, the official Twitter page heading changed to "That's all, folks! Thank you for the past 42 years".

The new building owner, Mr. Sater, has stated that he would like the venue to remain as a home to some sort of nightlife. On March 31, 2017, the venue reopened as a completely renovated live music venue called Sonia, now part of The Middle East complex.

== Notable musical performances ==
TT's has hosted such well-known Boston and national acts, examples being:

- Willie Alexander
- Arcade Fire
- Bikini Kill
- Blake Babies
- Brian Jonestown Massacre
- Chucklehead
- Clairvoyance
- Collapsis
- Crocodile Shop
- Rivers Cuomo of Weezer
- Dinosaur Jr.
- Dogmatics
- Tanya Donelly
- Dropkick Murphys
- Fear of Falling
- Fools
- Nelly Furtado
- Fuzzy
- Gregory and the Hawk
- Headband
- Indigo Girls
- Jane's Addiction
- The Kings of Nuthin'
- The Lemonheads
- Letters to Cleo
- Lyres
- Manic Street Preachers
- Mary Lou Lord
- The Mighty Mighty Bosstones
- Mission of Burma
- Morphine
- Neighborhoods
- Orbit
- The Outlets
- Pixies
- Plain Jane Automobile
- The Push Kings
- Scarce
- Scruffy the Cat
- Bettie Serveert
- The Shins
- Sloan
- The Smashing Pumpkins
- Someone Still Loves You Boris Yeltsin
- Sublime
- Tidal Wave
- Til Tuesday
- Tommy Stinson of The Replacements
- Mike Watt
- Ween
- Wheat
- Peter Wolf of J Geils Band

TT's hosted Boston's Rock 'n' Roll Rumble competition from 2011 until 2015.

== Awards ==
- 2009 Best Music Venue, small (Boston Magazine)
- 2008 Best Live Music Venue, small (Boston Magazine)
