= Manray =

Nightclub in Cambridge, Massachusetts

Coordinates: 42.3633°N 71.1022°W

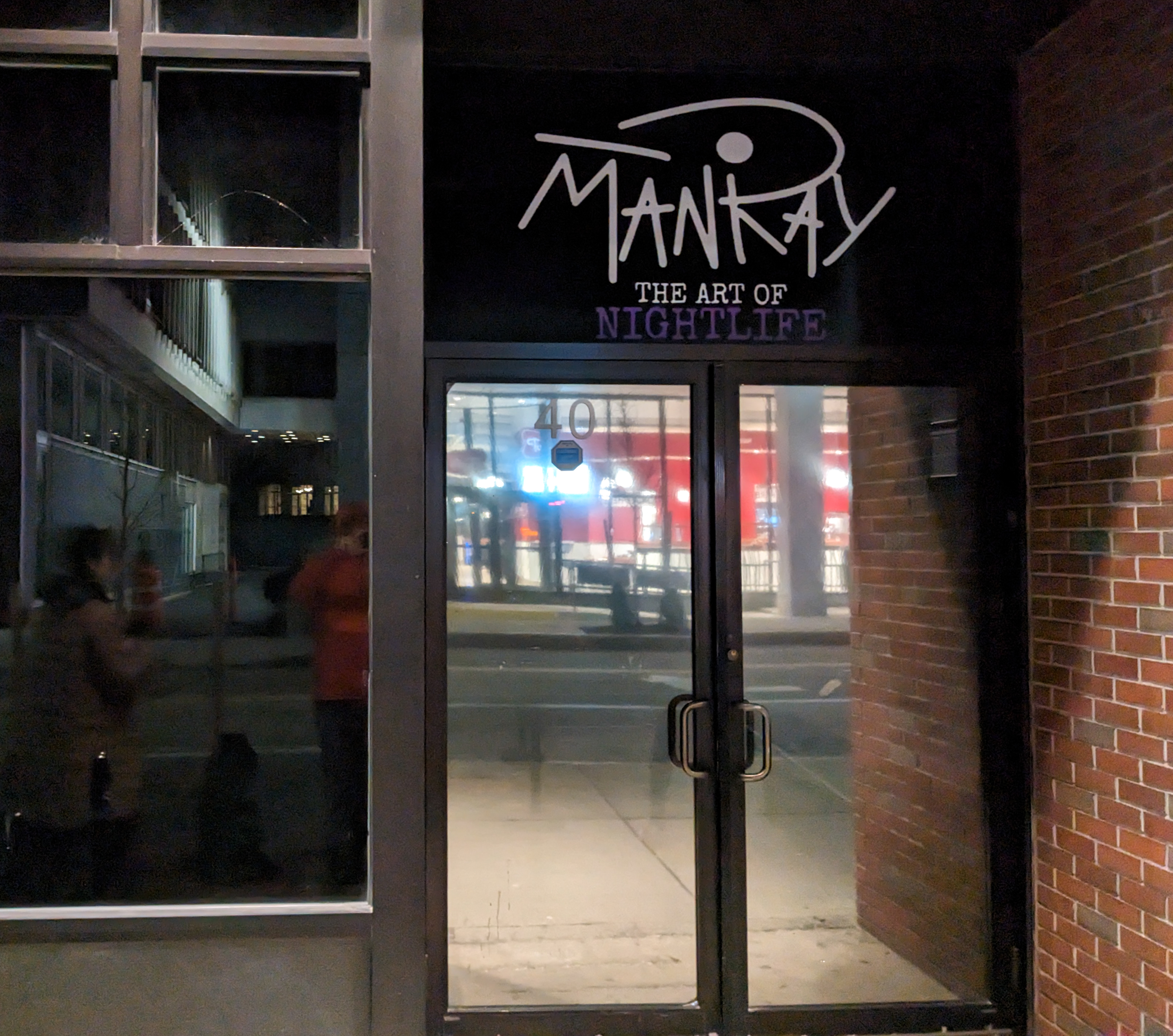
Front door of Manray danceclub, Cambridge, MA

Manray is a nightclub in Central Square, Cambridge, Massachusetts. It was named for Dada artist and photographer Man Ray.

== Early days ==
In 1983, Campus, a gay club, was built on a site previously occupied by Simeone's Restaurant. In 1985, the club was expanded under the moniker of Manray and its dance nights included a Campus event along with goth, new wave, industrial, and fetish nights. The club billed itself as an "art bar", and often featured gallery shows by local artists in its lounge area. Manray gained national attention when it was featured in Life Magazine.

== Culture ==
Manray catered to a variety of alternative lifestyles. Its longest-running night was Campus, a night "for gay men and their friends". Wednesday was designated a gothic event known as “Crypt”. A New Wave night was held every Saturday, which featured DJs Chris Ewen and Gary Conzo playing new wave and disco anthems, respectively. Manray also hosted many live music acts, including Nirvana.

Manray gained a reputation as a hotbed of strangeness in the early 1990s, when it became home to the goth and fetish/BDSM scenes in the Boston area. Alternating Friday night events would be geared to one, the other, or both subcultures, resulting in a local scene that was unique in its cross-pollination across recurring events with titles such as Hell, Xmortis, Fantasy Factory and Ooze.

== Closure and reopening ==
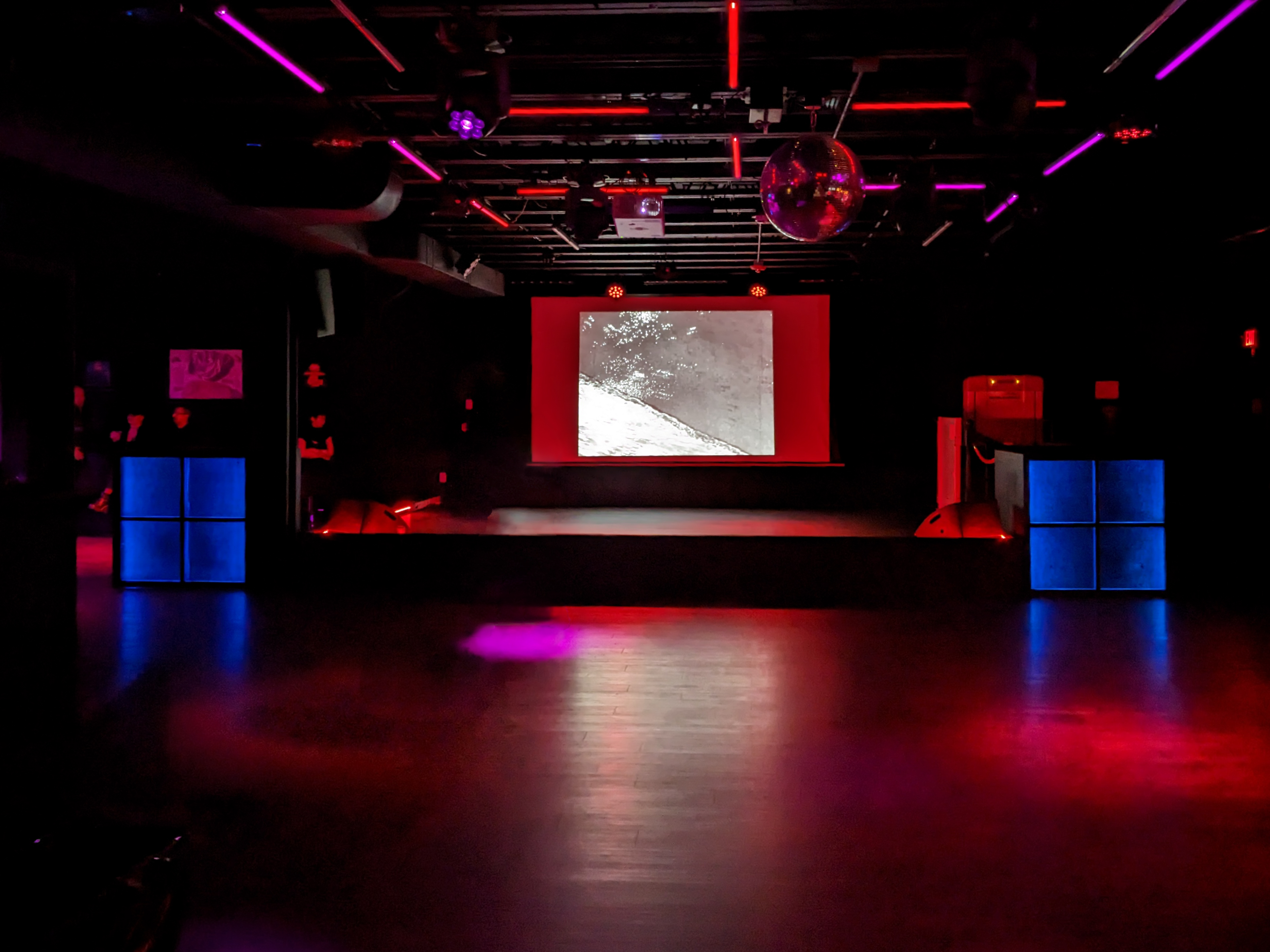
Dance floor at Manray at doors open, with projection screen

On July 30, 2005, after more than 20 years, Manray was forced to close its doors. The owner of the building decided to take advantage of the high property values, and to demolish the building in order to construct apartments. This followed a long process in which a building near Manray was declared historical, and the developer sought and eventually got permission to move that building to a new lot. Its final week was reported as a sad farewell by its patrons; discussions on and rumors of its reopening persisted for years.

In January 2023, ManRay reopened in the former ImprovBoston space at 40 Prospect Street in Cambridge. The Saturday of opening weekend had a "line wrapped around the corner and required hours of patience, in raw January temperatures".

== Oral history book ==
In January 2022, an oral history of the nightclub was released. The crowd-funded book, We Are But Your Children – An Oral History of the Nightclub ManRay, presents the history of the club and its importance to the communities that attended ManRay.
