= Paradise Rock Club =

Music venue in Boston, MA, US

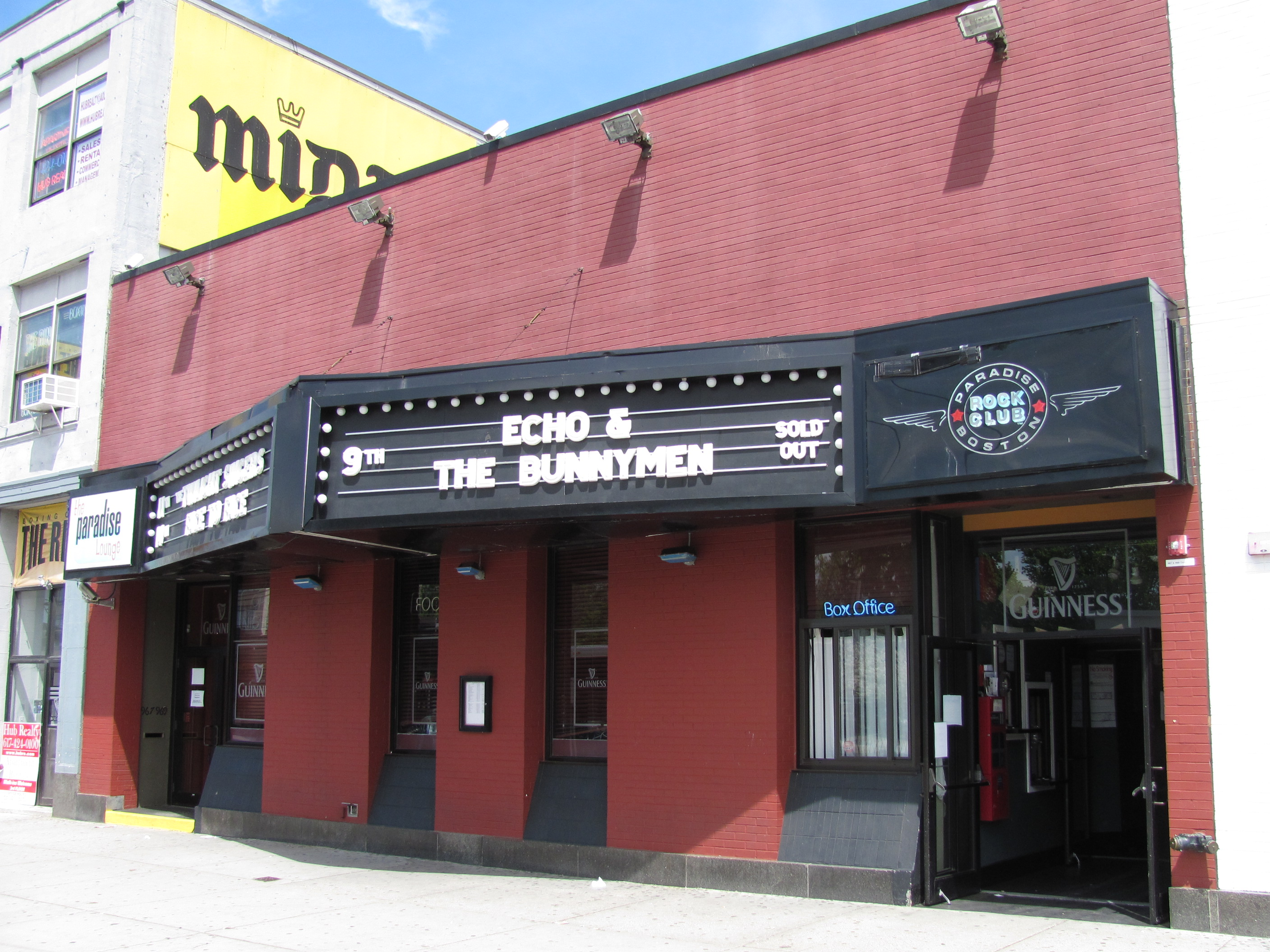
- Pictured in 2011
- Interactive map of Paradise Rock Club
- Former names: Paradise Theater
- Location: Boston, Massachusetts
- Coordinates: 42°21′6″N 71°7′11″W
- Owner: Crossroads Presents
- Seating type: General Admission (Standing)
- Capacity: 933
- Type: Club
- Event: Rock

Construction
- Opened: September 22, 1977

The Paradise Rock Club (formerly known as the Paradise Theater) is a 933-capacity music venue in Boston, Massachusetts. The venue accommodates small music festivals and non-music-related events. The Paradise is located on the edge of Boston University's campus and draws a student-based crowd. Most shows have an age requirement of eighteen or older.

== History ==
The Paradise Rock Club opened as the Paradise Theater on September 22, 1977. It was owned by The Don Law Company, a Boston music giant that also controlled the Boston Garden and the Cape Cod Coliseum. Don Law was a former BU student who got his start working as a promoter for the Boston band The Remains. Identifying Boston's large student population as a key music market, Law and colleague Frank Barsalona began purchasing Boston venues to capitalize on the strong local music scene and willing audience.

The band Phish's first large Boston show was at The Paradise in January 1989. Paradise management initially refused to book the group, so band management rented out the venue instead. It ended up being a sellout, with over 200 people excess outside the club unable to attend.

The Paradise was transferred to SFX Entertainment (now Live Nation) in 1998 when The Don Law Company (dba Blackstone Entertainment) was sold for a reported $80 million to SFX. But the venue was purchased back by Don Law and partner David Mugar in 2009 and subsequently owned by Don Law, Declan Mehigan and Joe Dunne. It is now owned by Law, Mehigan, Dunne and Mugar. The Don Law Company is now Crossroads Presents and still prominent players in the Boston music scene as owners of The Paradise, the Orpheum Theater, House of Blues Boston, and the Brighton Music Hall in partnership with Live Nation.

In 2010, Paradise Rock Club completed a three-month renovation that moved the stage fifteen feet to the left, relocated the box office to the front of the venue, demolished the bar and positioned it to the back of the venue. These renovation features provided an open view of the stage. The artist rooms were relocated to the second floor, and upgraded with televisions and refrigerators, as well as doubled in room size. Other new additions to the venue were a separate space provided for opening acts and a private bathroom with a shower installed next to the newly added dressing rooms. In addition, a new washer and dryer were also installed as "All the bands that come through are always looking for the nearest laundromat, so we figured, why not," said Declan Mehigan.
