= The Rathskeller =

Concert venue in Boston, US (1974-1997)

Coordinates: 42°20′54.97″N 71°5′46″W

- "The Rat"
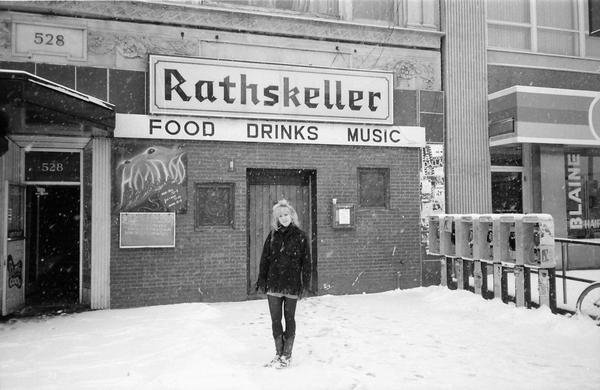
- Interactive map of The Rathskeller
- Location: 528 Commonwealth Avenue Kenmore Square, Boston
- Owner: Jimmy Harold
- Type: Music venue
- Events: Punk rock, alternative rock, hardcore punk, garage rock, rock and roll

Construction
- Opened: 1974
- Closed: 1997
- Demolished: 2000

The Rathskeller (known as the Rat) was a live music venue in Boston that was open from 1974 to 1997. It was considered the "granddaddy" of Boston rock venues.

During its heyday, the Rat hosted such acts as the Cars, the Pixies, Metallica, Dead Kennedys, the Ramones, Talking Heads, R.E.M., Dinosaur Jr., the Replacements, the Police, and Soundgarden. From 1980 to 1987, the Hoodoo BBQ, which Esquire called one of the "100 Best Restaurants in America"—was located at the Rat.

In the 1960s the Rat was a restaurant and bar catering to college students. At the time, it offered live music in a back room, featuring local bands such as the Remains (who opened for the Beatles on their final tour), the Lost (with future Boston punk Willie "Loco" Alexander) and the Mods (whose drummer Harry Sandler went on to play with "Boston Sound" hitmakers Orpheus). The Remains were so popular in 1965 the owner of the Rathskeller was forced to open up the basement for the overflow crowds that the Remains attracted. Live music was phased out in the late 1960s, returning in 1974.

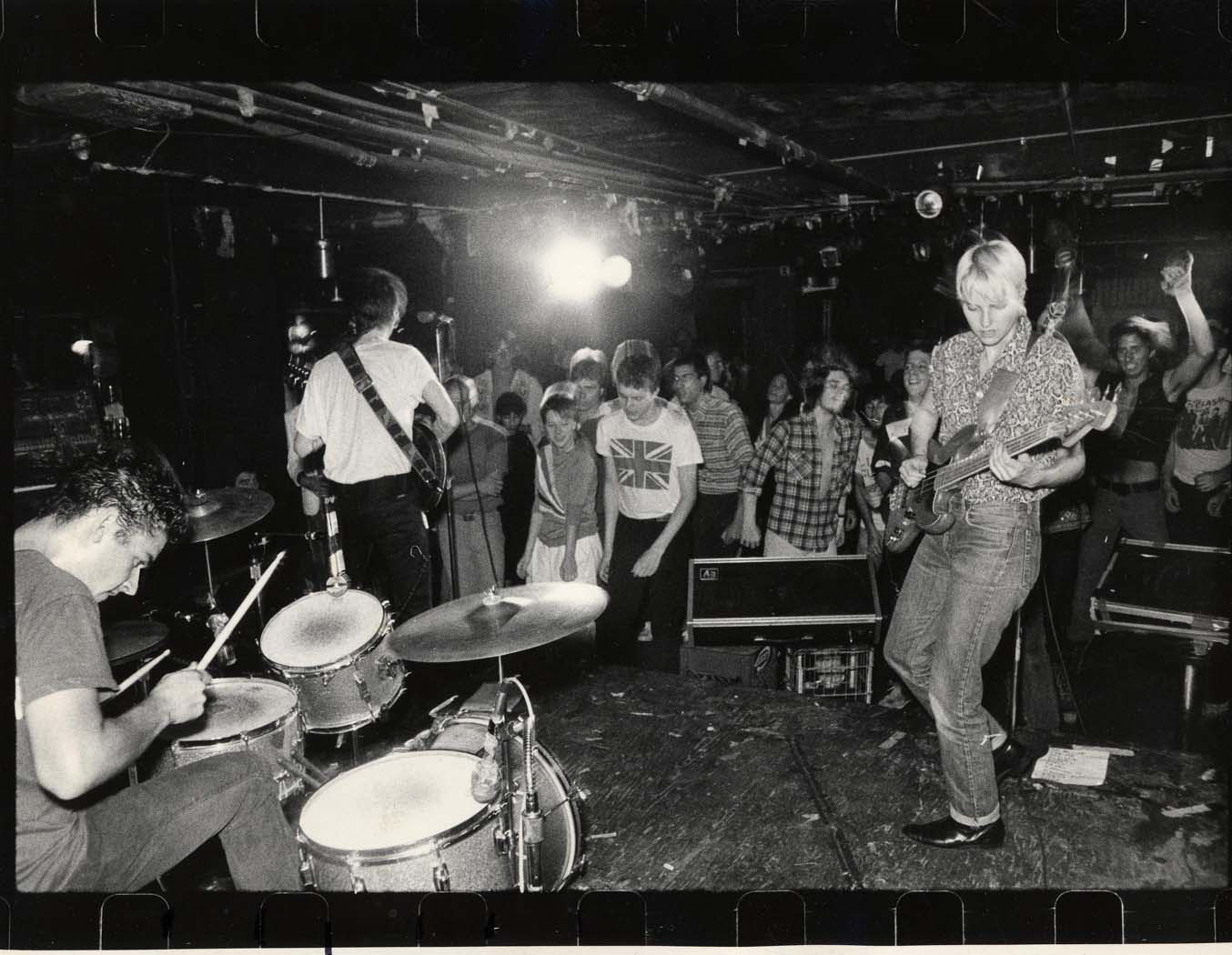
Aimee Mann (right) playing with the Young Snakes at the Rathskeller in 1981

The "locus of boston rock and roll," the Rat was noted for the artists who performed there before their commercial breakthroughs and the local bands and scenes it helped to develop. In 1976, the album Live at The Rat was released; it documented the music of the time as well as the importance of the club in the development of Boston rock and roll. The WBCN Rock & Roll Rumble was held at the Rat for its first three years and was originally referred to as the Rumble at the Rat. The Rat was important for its contribution to the Hardcore movement. In a 2010 interview, Ken Casey of the Dropkick Murphys said: "(The Rat) afforded us the opportunity to have a place to play and develop our fan base, and it was just amazing to us. And the reason I credit it with all of our success, was this is how we started to tour. The hardcore punk scene in the mid-’90s was huge in Boston."

References to the Rat's cultural impact can be found in the book All Souls, The Sound of Our Town, the film All Ages: The Boston Hardcore Film, and in both Guitar Hero II and Guitar Hero Encore: Rocks the 80s.

The Rathskeller closed in November 1997, and was torn down in October 2000 to make way for the Hotel Commonwealth, a 148-room luxury hotel.
