= The Middle East (nightclub) =

Venue and restaurants in Massachusetts, US

Coordinates: 42.363835°N 71.101420°W

- Interactive map of The Middle East
- Address: 472 Massachusetts Avenue
- Location: Cambridge, Massachusetts
- Capacity: 1,279: Downstairs – 575; Sonia – 350; Upstairs – 194; ZuZu – 100; Corner – 60

Construction
- Opened: 1970; 56 years ago

Website
- mideastoffers.com

The Middle East is an entertainment complex consisting of five adjacent dining and live music venues in the Central Square neighborhood of Cambridge, Massachusetts. Its three dedicated concert spaces, Upstairs, Downstairs, and Sonia, sit alongside ZuZu and The Corner, two restaurants that also host live music. Having featured a huge variety of musicians since 1987, the establishment was described in 2007 as "the nexus of metro Boston's rock-club scene for local and touring bands" by the Boston Phoenix.

The establishment was founded as a Lebanese restaurant which was purchased by the Sater family in the 1970s. Incentivized by a local music promoter Billy Ruane's birthday party, The Middle East began to book more local rock groups starting in 1987. It gradually expanded into a full-fledged entertainment complex as the owners purchased nearby properties and incorporated them into The Middle East brand, most recently turning T.T. the Bear's Place into The Middle East's Sonia in 2017.

== History ==
The Middle East opened as a Lebanese restaurant in 1970. In 1975, after brothers Joseph and Nabil Sater Habib purchased the establishment, they expanded into a store front at 472 Massachusetts Avenue. The brothers maintained the ethnic food and, in keeping with the theme of the restaurant, they had Arab-language bands, music and belly dancers. The area is now known as The Middle East Upstairs. In the 1980s they booked blues and jazz music. It was not until 1987 that the first rock show was played by a solo Roger Miller of Mission of Burma fame.

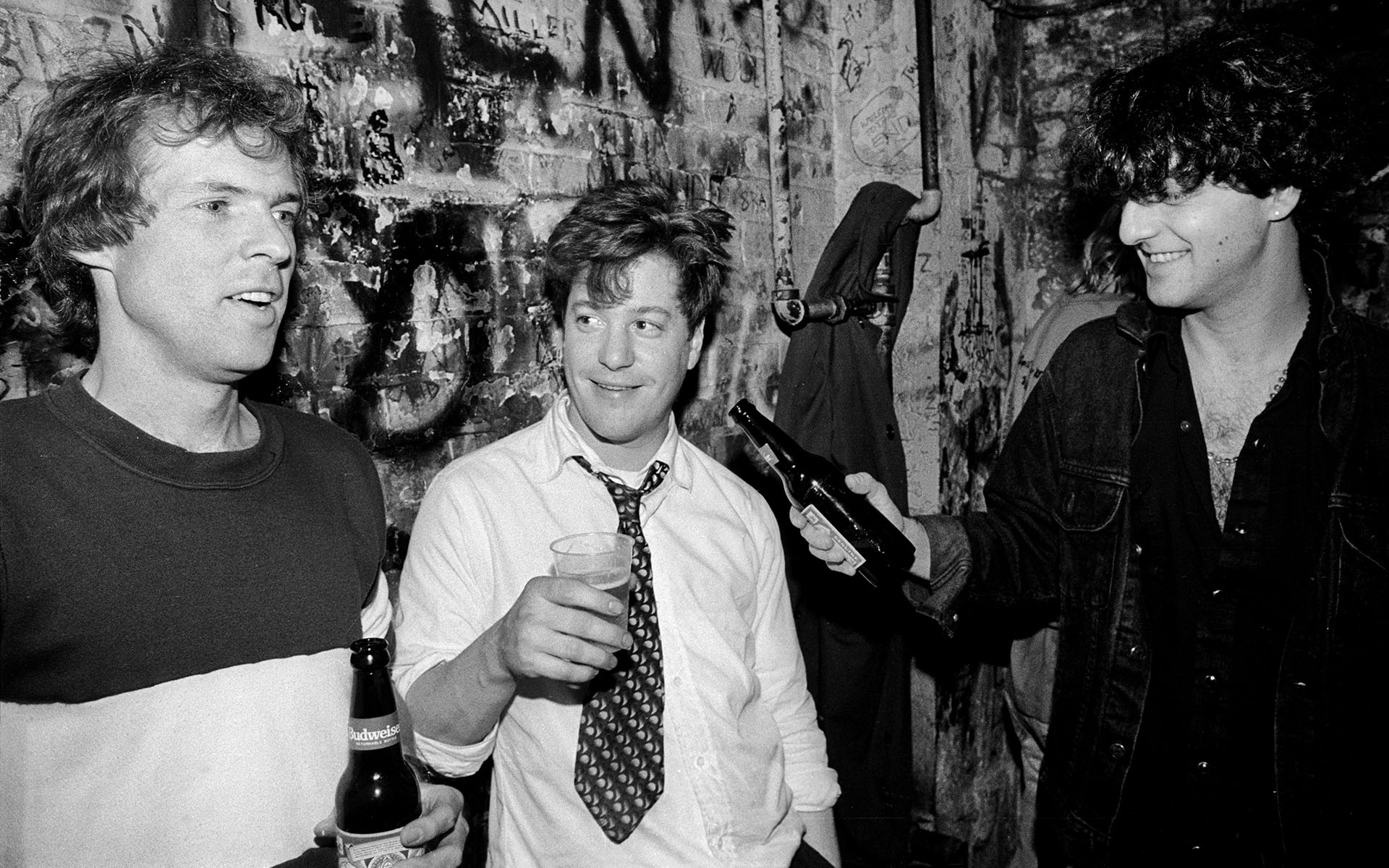
Billy Ruane with singer and guitarist Tommy White of the Mighty Ions, (left) and Mark Davis, drummer in the Real Kids (right). William J. Ruane was instrumental in transforming the Middle East restaurant in to a rock club.

Later that year a birthday party was thrown by local music promoter Billy Ruane at T.T. the Bear's Place, a small rock club next door. Having overbooked T.T.'s, Ruane worked with the Sater brothers to have some of his party spill over to The Middle East and allow bands to play at their establishment. Ruane was quoted in 2007 by the Boston Phoenix saying to a 20th anniversary reunion crowd: "You remember what happened — I threw a fuckin' party that got too fuckin’ big".

In 1988, there were several other expansions of The Middle East. First the Sater brothers converted the Vouros bakery at the corner of Massachusetts Avenue and Brookline Street into a bar/restaurant. This section known as The Corner or the Bakery, has a small stage against the window to Mass. Avenue, where local small bands and DJs play. In 1993, in order to create a space for more popular musical acts to perform, the basement of the building, that was formerly a bowling alley, was converted into a music venue. This is now known as The Middle East Downstairs. The Corner acts as an entrance, waiting area and ticket section to the Downstairs.

In 2001 the Sater brothers took over the lease of the last remaining portion of the current Middle East complex positioned between the Front and the Corner which was an Indian restaurant at the time. It became ZuZu, named after the childhood nickname of one of the Sater brothers, and is a separate restaurant serving upscale cuisine. In 2002 this venue was further updated by Lilli Dennison to have a night club type style. ZuZu features live music and DJs several times a week. In March 2017, the Sater brothers opened the fifth Middle East venue called Sonia, a nightclub in the former location of T.T. the Bear's Place, adjacent to the existing Middle East complex.

In 2020, Nabil Sater said the property was listed for sale, although no likely offers had been received. In 2022, he applied for a permit from the Cambridge Historical Commission to demolish the existing building and build a six-story mixed-use building, with a hotel on the upper floors and music venue space on the first floor and in the basement.

== Reputation ==
According to the Weekly Dig, The Middle East "reigns supreme as Boston's best rock and/or roll joint". The Boston Globe has called it the city's "hippest night spot." Rolling Stone described the club as "the exalted Middle East. The importance of The Middle East to the music scene in Greater Boston spans many genres. The Boston Phoenix described the site:

Still the premier place to hear indie rock, the Middle East also has garnered a reputation for serving up the cream of the indie hip-hop crop. Voted best hip-hop club by our readers for the third year running, the Middle East has played host to Mr. Lif, 7L & Esoteric, Los Nativos, Jedi Mind Tricks, Killah Priest, OuterSpace, Irepress, Masta Killah, and Jake the Snake, among others. The Middle East has no rival when it comes to underground hiphop.

Steve Albini of Shellac and former member of Big Black commented in the Boston Phoenix:

We enjoy playing Boston, we always have good shows there, although it's hard to do a show there. The Middle East is pretty much the only friendly venue for us -- meaning not corporate-controlled and that doesn’t have a bunch of insane curtailment policies in place that prevent you from behaving like a normal band.

The Middle East is also a venue for artists in other genres including "jazz, blues, funk, reggae, ska, pop, punk, and various combinations thereof". In the early 1990s, The Middle East quickly became an instrumental part of the music culture in the Boston area. "It's where new talent was quickly discovered and given voice. It was where established bands tried out new things on their audience. It was slowly reshaping the scene." The Middle East receives continuous awards from local newspapers for their food and music venues.

Massachusetts bands that played at The Middle East include Aerosmith in 1995, Dick Dale in '95, Guster in '96, Powerman 5000 in '97, Staind in '97, Godsmack in '97 Dropkick Murphys in '98, The Kings of Nuthin' every year from 1999 to 2005, American Hi-Fi and Father John Misty in 2009, Ice Nine Kills in 2017, Have Heart in 2026, and Slapshot multiple times throughout the 1990s to the 2020s.

== Mural ==
In 1992, the Oakland artist Daniel Galvez painted a large-scale mural on the outer wall of the Middle East, which celebrates the cultural diversity of Cambridge, Massachusetts. Galvez returned in 2017 to restore the mural, which had become an icon in the area.

== Venue ==
Headlights, an Illinois-based indie rock band, perform at the Middle East in their upstairs room.

Begun in 1974 as a Lebanese restaurant owned and operated by the Sater family, The Middle East has since expanded into adjacent storefronts and is now a complex of five different areas each with its own entrance. They are (from left to right):

- Upstairs at The Middle East, a 194-person-capacity concert space
- ZuZu, a restaurant and bar with sophisticated decor and menu that features live music several nights a week with small occasional cover charge
- The Corner, a 70-person-capacity restaurant and bar that features live music several nights a week and open mic comedy on Tuesday nights with no cover charge; often has belly dancers (Sunday/Wednesday) and Lebanese musicians to complement the Lebanese cuisine
- Downstairs at The Middle East, a 575-person-capacity concert space that has hosted many better-known, national artists.
- Sonia, a 350-person capacity concert space

=== Recordings ===
There have been several live recordings at The Middle East Downstairs, including The Mighty Mighty Bosstones' Live from The Middle East, Dinosaur Jr's Live at the Middle East DVD, The Minibosses' Live at the Middle East, Mr. Lif's Live at the Middle East, Harry and the Potters' Live at the Yule Ball EP, Eyesinweasel's Live at the Middle East and Scissorfight's Instant Live, Middle East-Cambridge, MA,11/13/0.

=== Collaborations ===
From 1995 until 2006, The Middle East was host to the WBCN Rock & Roll Rumble, a well-publicized "battle of the bands" more than three decades old; the Rumble is slated to return to The Middle East in 2023. The Middle East is also a prominent participant at the Cambridge River Festival, an annual musical and cultural event along the banks of the Charles River between Central and Harvard Square.

=== Awards ===
- 2004-2007 Boston Phoenix (Best Club for Rock)
- 2005-2008 Weekly Dig (Best Mid-Sized Music Venue)
- 2008 Improper Bostonian Awards (Boston's Best Rock Club)
- 2008 Citysearch (Best Music Venue)
- 2008 Citysearch (Best Live Music Venue)
- 2009 Boston Phoenix (Best Tattooed Bouncers)
- 2009 City Voter (Best Live Music Venue)
- 2009 Weekly Dig Awards (Best Middle Eastern Restaurant)
- 2010 Boston Phoenix Best (Best Hip-Hop Venue)
- 2010 WBZ's A list (Best Live Music Venue)

== See also ==
- List of Lebanese restaurants
