= The Best of Morphine: 1992–1995 =

The Best of Morphine, 1992–1995

Greatest hits album by Morphine
- Released: February 18, 2003
- Recorded: 1992–1995 (US edition); 1992–1999 (European edition)
- Genre: Alternative rock; indie rock; jazz rock
- Length: 59:09 (US edition); 62:43 (European edition)
- Label: Rykodisc
- Producer: Mark Sandman; Paul Q. Kolderie

Morphine chronology
Bootleg Detroit (2000)	The Best of Morphine, 1992–1995 (2003)	Sandbox: The Music of Mark Sandman (2004)

Professional ratings
Review scores
Source	Rating
AllMusic	4/5 stars
Pitchfork	(6.7/10)
Uncut	1.5/5 stars

The Best of Morphine, 1992–1995 is a greatest hits compilation by alternative rock band Morphine, released by Rykodisc in February 2003.

The Best of Morphine, 1992–1995 chronicles the band's first four albums: Good, Cure For Pain, Yes and B-sides and Otherwise, and includes two previously unreleased tracks: “Pretty Face”, a dark atmospheric ballad recorded live in one take at Morphine's studio in Cambridge, MA, and “Jack and Tina”, described by Morphine drummer Billy Conway as “the most beautiful bridge Mark Sandman ever wrote.” The B-side of the long-out-of-print 1000-piece pressing of “Cure for Pain” on 7" vinyl called “Sexy Christmas Baby Mine” (1993) rounds out the adventure through Morphine musical history. The CD is enhanced with a video of the song “Shame”, recorded at the Masquerade in Atlanta.

In Europe, the album was released as simply The Best Of Morphine and also included a song from Like Swimming and two songs from The Night. These had to be omitted on the US release because The Night was released by DreamWorks, not Rykodisc, in North America. In Europe, all Morphine albums appeared on Rykodisc, which made it possible to release the Best Of album with a career-spanning track listing.

South American editions are the same as the European version but also include the song "Early to Bed" from Like Swimming, making it a 17-track compilation.

== Track listing ==
=== USA edition ===
All tracks are written by Mark Sandman.

No.	Title	Source album	Length
1.	"Buena"	Cure for Pain, 1993	3:20
2.	"Honey White"	Yes, 1995	3:08
3.	"You Speak My Language"	Good, 1992	3:26
4.	"Cure for Pain"	Cure for Pain	3:13
5.	"Candy"	Cure for Pain	3:14
6.	"Have a Lucky Day"	Good	3:28
7.	"I'm Free Now"	Cure for Pain	3:26
8.	"Thursday"	Cure for Pain	3:27
9.	"Super Sex"	Yes	3:52
10.	"Whisper"	Yes	3:29
11.	"Radar"	Yes	3:29
12.	"You Look Like Rain"	Good	3:39
13.	"Jack and Tina"	previously unreleased	8:30
14.	"Pretty Face"	previously unreleased	4:49
15.	"Shame"	B-Sides and Otherwise, 1997	2:44
16.	"Sexy Christmas Baby Mine"	vinyl-only single, 1993	2:05
Total length:			59:09

=== European edition ===
All tracks are written by Mark Sandman.

No.	Title	Source album	Length
1.	"Have a Lucky Day"	Good, 1992	3:27
2.	"You Look Like Rain"	Good	3:38
3.	"You Speak My Language"	Good	3:25
4.	"Thursday"	Cure for Pain, 1993	3:26
5.	"Buena"	Cure for Pain	3:19
6.	"Cure for Pain"	Cure for Pain	3:13
7.	"Honey White"	Yes, 1995	3:06
8.	"Super Sex"	Yes	3:52
9.	"Whisper"	Yes	3:28
10.	"Eleven O'Clock"	Like Swimming, 1997	3:18
11.	"Top Floor, Bottom Buzzer"	The Night, 2000	5:42
12.	"The Night"	The Night	4:48
13.	"Jack and Tina"	previously unreleased	8:32
14.	"Pretty Face"	previously unreleased	4:47
15.	"Shame"	B-Sides and Otherwise, 1997	2:44
16.	"Sexy Christmas Baby Mine"	vinyl-only single, 1993	2:05
Total length:			62:43

The South American edition uses the track list of the European edition but adds "Early to Bed" (from Like Swimming) as track 10, and pushes the rest of the tracks down accordingly, for a total of 17.

== Personnel ==
Adapted from the album liner notes.

Morphine

- Mark Sandman – vocals, 2-string slide bass, tritar, guitar, piano, Chamberlin, organ
- Dana Colley – baritone saxophone, tenor saxophone, double saxophone
- Billy Conway – drums, percussion

Additional musicians

- Jerome Deupree – drums on "Buena", "Candy", "Have a Lucky Day", "I'm Free Now", "Thursday" and "Pretty Face"
- Charlie Kohlhase – baritone saxophone on "Jack and Tina"

Technical personnel

- Mark Sandman – producer
- Paul Q. Kolderie – producer
- Toby Mountain – mastering
- Steven Jurgensmeyer – design
- Ferenc Dobronyi – design
- Dana Colley – woodcuts
- Lana Kaplan – band photography
