= B-Sides and Otherwise =

1997 compilation album by Morphine

Compilation album by Morphine
- Released: September 1997
- Recorded: 1993–1997
- Studios: Hi-N-Dry (Cambridge, MA); Fort Apache (Cambridge, MA); The Outpost (Stoughton, MA); Bullet Sound (Nederhorst den Berg, the Netherlands)
- Genres: Alternative rock; jazz rock
- Label: Rykodisc
- Producers: Mark Sandman; Paul Q. Kolderie; Morphine

Morphine chronology
Like Swimming (1997)	B-Sides and Otherwise (1997)	The Night (2000)

Professional ratings
Review scores
Source	Rating
AllMusic	3/5 stars
Pitchfork Media	(5.0/10)

B-Sides and Otherwise is a rarities compilation album by the alternative rock band Morphine, released in September 1997 by Rykodisc. It features B-Sides and other rare tracks not otherwise available on the band's studio albums.

== Background ==
In 1996, when Morphine's record contract with Rykodisc was sold off to DreamWorks at the band's request, the band still owed Rykodisc two albums. An agreement was made in which Rykodisc obtained the exclusive rights to the two future archival releases B-Sides and Otherwise and 2000's Bootleg Detroit.

Band leader Mark Sandman had originally wanted the compilation to be called Besides, but when informed that label mates Sugar had released a B-sides collection of the same name, Sandman subsequently came up with B-Sides and Otherwise.

== Critical reception ==
In an indifferent review, Pitchfork wrote that B-Sides and Otherwise shows the two sides of Morphine: "the creepy, grooving side ... and the boring, pretentious art rock-cum-beat poet masturbations that make up the bulk of this disc." Similarly, Trouser Press felt that there were only a few "truly effective numbers" on the compilation, "aside from the selections buzzing on free-form atmospherics that bring the trio uncomfortably close to skronky jazz."

AllMusic described the album as "more challenging and abstract than your average Morphine release." They felt that some tracks, like the eight-minute "soundscape" "Down Love's Tributaries," may test the listener's patience, while others are "thoroughly enjoyable." They concluded it is "an interesting collection of oddities that will appeal to the dedicated fan," capturing the band "at their most experimental."

== Track listing ==
All tracks are written by Mark Sandman, except where indicated.

No.	Title	Writer(s)	Original release	Length
1.	"Have a Lucky Day" (live radio broadcast)		"Super Sex" single (1995)	4:23
2.	"All Wrong" (live radio broadcast)		"Honey White" single (1995)	3:40
3.	"I Know You - Part Two" (live radio broadcast)		"Honey White" single	2:54
4.	"Bo's Veranda"		Get Shorty (Original MGM Motion Picture Soundtrack) (1995)	3:14
5.	"Mile High"		Things to Do in Denver When You're Dead soundtrack (1995)	3:02
6.	"Shame"		"Cure for Pain" single (1993)	2:44
7.	"Down Love's Tributaries"	Morphine	"Cure for Pain" single	8:08
8.	"Kerouac"	Sandman, Billy Conway	Kerouac: Kicks Joy Darkness tribute (1997)	2:54
9.	"Pulled Over the Car"		Yes (1995) [Japan exclusive]	2:56
10.	"Sundayafternoonweightlessness"	Morphine	"Super Sex" single	4:52
11.	"Virgin Bride"		from an Australian-only bonus CD included with Like Swimming (1997)	3:29
12.	"Mail"	Sandman, Ernest Noyes Brookings	Outstandingly Ignited - Lyrics by Ernest Noyes Brookings, Vol. 4 compilation (1995)	2:19
13.	"My Brain"		"Cure for Pain" single	2:45

Notes

- Tracks 1–3 recorded live May 25, 1994, at Bullet Sound, Nederhorst den Berg, the Netherlands, for 2 Meter Sessies (NOS/VARA TV)

== Personnel ==
Adapted from the album liner notes:

Morphine

- Mark Sandman – vocals, 2-string slide bass, organ, guitar, knobs
- Dana Colley – baritone saxophone, tenor saxophone, soprano saxophone, autoharp, dobro feedback
- Billy Conway – drums

Additional musicians

- Mike Rivard – bass (4)
- Russ Gershon – tenor saxophone on (4, 5)
- Tom Halter – trumpet (5)
- Larry Dersch – drums (5)
- Jerome Deupree – drums (6)
- Sabine Hrechdakian – vocals (7)
- Frank Swart – bass (12)
- Dominique Zar – drums (12)
- Rick Barry – percussion (13)

Technical

- Morphine – producer (1–3)
- Mark Sandman – producer (4–7, 9, 10, 12, 13), engineer at Hi-N-Dry (4, 5, 7, 8, 10, 12, 13), cover design
- Paul Q. Kolderie – producer (6, 9), engineer at Fort Apache (6, 9, 11) and The Outpost (6)
- Han Nuyton – engineer at Bullet Sound (1–3)
- Phil Davidson – mixing (1–3)

== Charts ==
Chart performance for B-Sides and Otherwise
Chart (2024)	Peak position
Croatian International Albums (HDU)	40
