= Cure for Pain =

1993 studio album by Morphine

Studio album by Morphine
- Released: September 14, 1993
- Studios: Fort Apache; Hi-N-Dry (Cambridge, MA.)
- Genres: Alternative rock; jazz-rock
- Length: 37:11
- Label: Rykodisc
- Producers: Paul Q. Kolderie; Mark Sandman

Morphine chronology
Good (1992)	Cure for Pain (1993)	Yes (1995)

Professional ratings
Review scores
Source	Rating
AllMusic	4.5/5 stars
NME	8/10
Q	4/5 stars
Rolling Stone	3/5 stars

Cure for Pain is the second studio album by alternative rock band Morphine, released through Rykodisc in September 1993. Jerome Deupree, the band's original drummer, quit due to health problems during the recording of the album and was replaced by Billy Conway.

The tracks "Sheila" and "In Spite of Me" were prominently featured on the soundtrack of the 1994 independent film Spanking the Monkey. The tracks "Dawna" and "Buena" appear in the first season of The Sopranos, and "Buena" appears in the Daria episode "The Teachings of Don Jake," and the barroom scene in the 1997 film Ulee's Gold.

As of 1995, it has sold 107,000 copies in United States and over 300,000 copies worldwide. As of 2017, combined sales of Cure for Pain and 1995's Yes are 661,000 sold copies in United States.

== Track listing ==
All tracks are written by Mark Sandman, except as noted.

No.	Title	Writer(s)	Length
1.	"Dawna"	Sandman, Dana Colley	0:44
2.	"Buena"		3:19
3.	"I'm Free Now"		3:24
4.	"All Wrong"		3:40
5.	"Candy"		3:14
6.	"A Head with Wings"		3:39
7.	"In Spite of Me"		2:34
8.	"Thursday"		3:26
9.	"Cure for Pain"		3:13
10.	"Mary Won't You Call My Name?"		2:29
11.	"Let's Take a Trip Together"		2:59
12.	"Sheila"		2:49
13.	"Miles Davis' Funeral"		1:41
Total length:			37:11

Japanese edition bonus track

No.	Title	Writer(s)	Length
14.	"Down Love's Tributaries" (from the "Cure for Pain" CD single)	Sandman, Colley, Billy Conway	8:08
Total length:			45:20

=== 2021 vinyl expanded edition ===
In December 2021, the Run Out Groove label released a vinyl-only edition of Cure for Pain, which included a bonus record of unreleased and new-to-vinyl-rarities, all remastered from the original source tapes.

- side one (1-7) and two (8-13) as per original album

Side three
No.	Title	Writer(s)	Length
1.	"Mile High" (from the Things to Do in Denver When You're Dead soundtrack, 1995)		3:02
2.	"Bo's Veranda" (from the Get Shorty soundtrack, 1995)		3:14
3.	"All Wrong" (alternate early version)		3:25
4.	"Third Stone from the Sun" (previously unreleased)	Jimi Hendrix	1:39
5.	"Down Love's Tributaries" (from the "Cure for Pain" CD single)		8:08
6.	"Miles Davis' Funeral" (alternate fast version)		1:17

Side four
No.	Title	Writer(s)	Length
7.	"I Can Do That" (previously released on Sandbox: The Music of Mark Sandman, 2004)		1:52
8.	"Kerouac" (from the tribute CD Kerouac: Kicks Joy Darkness, 1997)	Sandman, Conway	2:53
9.	"I'm Free Now" (alternate early version)		2:18
10.	"Groovy Beat" (early version of "Buena")		1:58
11.	"My Brain" (full-length version)		3:23
12.	"Untitled Spoken Word Piece" (previously unreleased)		4:40
13.	"A Married Woman" (previously unreleased)		3:42
14.	"Pizza Hut Variation #2" (previously unreleased)		0:34
Total length:			42:05

== Personnel ==
Morphine

- Mark Sandman – vocals, 2-string slide bass, tritar, guitar, organ
- Dana Colley – baritone saxophone, tenor saxophone, backing vocals (8, 10)
- Jerome Deupree – drums
- Billy Conway – drums (9, 11), cocktail drum overdub (8)

Additional musicians

- Jimmy Ryan – mandolin (7)
- Ken Winokur – percussion (13)

Technical

- Paul Q. Kolderie – producer (2–6, 8–10, 12), engineer (2–6, 8–10, 12), mixing (2–6, 8–10, 12)
- Mark Sandman – producer (1, 7, 11, 13), engineer (1, 7, 11, 13), mixing (1, 7, 11, 13), photography (color pictures)
- Steve Folsom – engineer (11)
- Toby Mountain – mastering
- Robin Spencer – design
- Cindy Bortman – photography (black and white pictures)
- Dennis Stein – photography (bass picture)
- Recorded and mixed at Fort Apache, Cambridge, MA., except tracks 1, 7, 11 and 13 recorded and mixed at Hi-N-Dry, Cambridge, MA., and tracks 4 and 9 mixed at Q Division, Somerville, MA.

Bonus tracks

- Larry Dersch – drums on "Mile High"
- Russ Gershon – tenor saxophone on "Mile High" and "Bo's Veranda"
- Tom Halter – trumpet on "Mile High"
- Mike Rivard – bass on "Bo's Veranda"
- Sabine Hrechdakian – vocals on "Down Love's Tributaries"
- Rick Barry – percussion on "My Brain"

== Charts ==
Chart performance for Cure for Pain
Chart (1994)	Peak position
Australian Albums (ARIA)	65
Dutch Albums (Album Top 100)	67
New Zealand Albums (RMNZ)	25

2013 chart performance for Cure for Pain
Chart (2013)	Peak position
Belgian Albums (Ultratop Flanders)	103

2024 chart performance for Cure for Pain
Chart (2024)	Peak position
Hungarian Physical Albums (MAHASZ)	37
