= Sandbox: The Music of Mark Sandman =

Studio album by Mark Sandman
- Released: November 2004
- Recorded: 1980s–1990s
- Studios: Fort Apache; Hi-N-Dry; Q-Division; The Outpost; Hell; Playtime; Uncle Comfys
- Genre: Alternative rock
- Length: 110:48
- Label: Hi-N-Dry
- Producers: Paul Q. Kolderie; Sean Slade; Tom Dube; Bob Holmes

Sandbox: The Music of Mark Sandman (also known as Sandbox: Mark Sandman Original Music) is a posthumously-released 2-CD/1-DVD set of music written and performed by American musician Mark Sandman released in November 2004 by Hi-N-Dry and distributed by KUFALA.

The set contains 31 songs on the CDs, mostly unreleased before Sandbox, while the accompanying DVD contains music videos, interviews, live performances, artwork, and photos.The songs are performed by Sandman and his various bands and projects, including solo recordings, song with Morphine, Treat Her Right, Hypnosonics, Pale Brothers, Supergroup, Candy Bar, Treat Her Orange. However, none of the tracks on the two CDs are credited to a particular band.

== Background ==
After Sandman's death in 1999, remaining Morphine members Dana Colley and Billy Conway, among others, opened up Sandman's home studio, Hi-N-Dry, for public use and started a record label of the same name. But when they tried to release Sandbox, Morphine's former label Rykodisc filed a lawsuit, claiming they owned several of the recordings. Hi-N-Dry eventually won the case in court, but with no money left to promote the album it received little notice upon original release.

According to Paste magazine, "Sandbox frequently extends beyond Morphine’s core sound" – blues and jazz elements combined with rock (2-string slide bass, saxophone and drums) – "highlighting territory Sandman explored in side projects." These projects included Sandman's longest-running side band, the horn-driven funk ensemble Hypnosonics (1986-1999); Supergroup with Chris Ballew (the Presidents of the United States of America); and the Jimmy Ryan (Blood Oranges) collaborations Treat Her Orange and the Pale Brothers.

== Critical reception ==
Professional ratings
Review scores
Source	Rating
The Austin Chronicle	3/5 stars
Deseret News	4/5 stars
Enjoy the Music.com	5/5 stars
PopMatters	7/10

Trouser Press wrote that, with few exceptions, Sandbox "is nothing but memorable hooks and perceptive storytelling ... piano pops up in "Tomorrow," melodic allusions to the Kinks' "Celluloid Heroes" surface in "Patience," blow-your-woofer rock drives "Goddess" and "Doreen," and "Hombre" and "Hotel Room" will leave you sobbing in your cerveza. Each song brings something new to the table." Riverfront Times felt that Sandman's "cast-offs" and side projects were better than many other performers' best material, and that his "inviting, clear, honest singing, and the slightly rough-hewn joie de vivre in the instrumental performances" were the album's "unifying qualities." They concluded that Sandbox is not a "for-devotees-only collection" but for "anyone who values music encompassing both "roots" and restless creativity (Tom Waits, say)." Dallas Observer wrote, "The first disc, aside from a few kitschy songs, has a surprising number of strong Morphine outtakes. A studio version of live favorite "Goddess" is worth the price of admission, while the soft piano eulogy of "Devil's Boots," the country twinge of "Patience" and the spacey poetry of "Imaginary Song" reveal unseen shades of Morphine that will appease fans." They felt that most of the second disc "are for die-hards only."

== Track listing ==
All tracks are written by Mark Sandman.

Disc one
No.	Title	Length
1.	"Double Stripper Double Sax"	1:05
2.	"I Can Do That"	1:53
3.	"Tomorrow"	3:28
4.	"Patience"	3:27
5.	"Cocoon"	4:11
6.	"Imaginary Song"	2:53
7.	"Goddess"	3:57
8.	"Jealous Dream"	2:56
9.	"Justine"	4:27
10.	"The Phone"	2:24
11.	"Devil's Boots"	4:50
12.	"Born Again"	3:10
13.	"Wig"	3:27
14.	"51%"	2:32
15.	"Good Time Last Night"	1:35
Total length:		46:19

Disc two
No.	Title	Length
1.	"Riley the Dog"	3:24
2.	"Some Other Dog"	3:28
3.	"Snow"	3:48
4.	"Doreen"	4:39
5.	"Get Along"	3:13
6.	"Mona's Sister"	3:23
7.	"Hombre"	4:11
8.	"Hotel Room"	3:52
9.	"Let's Not Talk"	2:42
10.	"Bathtub"	3:21
11.	"I Wanna Go Home"	5:08
12.	"Deep Six"	2:48
13.	"Livin' With U"	3:49
14.	"They Bent Me"	5:45
15.	"Middle East"	5:44
16.	"Early Man"	5:09
Total length:		64:29

DVD

Unreleased videos
No.	Title	Band	Length
1.	"Temptation"	Either/Orchestra	5:17
2.	"I Think She Likes Me"	Treat Her Right	3:46
3.	"Money"	Treat Her Right	3:17
4.	"Marie"	Treat Her Right	3:06

Interviews
No.	Title	Band	Length
5.	"Canoe"	Morphine	3:19
6.	"Galicia"	Morphine	3:29
7.	"Kid"	Morphine	6:52
8.	"Soundcheck"	Morphine	7:48
9.	"Pinkpop"	Morphine	3:00
10.	"Kitchen"	Morphine	4:23
11.	"Last"	Morphine	1:39

Live
No.	Title	Band	Length
12.	"I Want to Go Home"	Candy Bar	6:05
13.	"Someone Stole My Shoes"	Hypnosonics	6:42
14.	"Temptation"	Sandman	2:54
15.	"Early Man"	Treat Her Right	4:10
16.	"Honest Job"	Treat Her Right	3:26
17.	"Hank"	Treat Her Right	4:24
18.	"Snow"	Treat Her Right	4:22
19.	"Pig Wig"	Morphine	1:32
20.	"Come Over Tonight"	Morphine	2:51
21.	"I Can Do That"	Morphine	2:48
22.	"Brain" (1st show at The Middle East)	Morphine	2:07

== Personnel ==
Adapted from the album's liner notes.

Musicians

- Mark Sandman – vocals, 2-string bass, 1-string bass, tritar, low guitar, acoustic guitar, electric guitar, piano, organ, synthesizer, banjo, manipulations
- Billy Conway, Jerome Deupree, Billy Beard, Larry Dersch, Mickey Bones, Ron Ward, Jay Hilt, Jim Clements, Dominique Zar, Ken Winokur, Rick Barry, Jim Janota, Harvey Wirht – drums
- Mike Rivard, Frank Swart, Chris Ballew, Rich Cortez, Rick McLaughlin – bass
- Dana Colley, Russ Gershon, Tom Halter, Mike Moss, Charlie Kohlhase, Colin Fisher, Joel Yennior – horns
- John Medeski – keyboards
- Jimmy Ryan – mandolin
- David Champagne – electric guitar
- Joe Kessler, Jane Scarpantoni – strings
- Laurie Sargent, Riley, Connie White, Toni Elka – backing vocals

Technical

- Paul Q. Kolderie, Sean Slade, Tom Dube, Bob Holmes – producer
- Matthew Ellard, Jim Siegal, Brian Dunton, Lothar Siegler, Dicky Speer, Joe Harvard, Jim Scott, Mike Denneen – engineer
- Toby Mountain – mastering
- John Wiswell – additional mastering
- Billy Conway, Dana Colley, Jerome Deupree, Laurie Sargent, Billy Beard, Jeff Sias, Brian Papciak – compilation
- Andrew D. Mazzone – executive producer
- Jabe Beyer, Dana Colley – layout, design
