= Like Swimming =

Studio album by Morphine
- Released: March 11, 1997
- Recorded: 1996
- Studios: Fort Apache; Hi-N-Dry; (Cambridge, Massachusetts)
- Genres: Alternative rock; jazz rock
- Length: 38:04
- Labels: DreamWorks; Rykodisc
- Producers: Mark Sandman; Paul Q. Kolderie

Morphine chronology
Yes (1995)	Like Swimming (1997)	The Night (2000)

Singles from Like Swimming
- 1. "Early to Bed" Released: 1997; 2. "Murder for the Money" Released: 1997 (France); 3. "Potion" Released: 1997 (Australia / New Zealand); 4. "Eleven O'Clock" Released: 1997 (Japan)

Like Swimming is the fourth studio album by the alternative rock band Morphine, released in March 1997 by DreamWorks/Rykodisc. It was Morphine's first album (out of two) released as part of their multi-album deal with DreamWorks and the last album released within the lifetime of singer and bassist Mark Sandman.

== Background ==
After releasing three albums for indie label Rykodisc between 1992 and 1995, Morphine wanted to leave the label in 1996 and sign with DreamWorks. Since the band still owed Rykodisc two albums, the two labels negotiated a deal where Like Swimming would carry branding of both labels in North America, and Rykodisc would have the rights for the rest of the world. The deal also included Rykodisc's exclusive rights to two future archival releases: B-Sides and Otherwise (1997) and Bootleg Detroit (2000).

Before the Morphine contract was sold off to DreamWorks, a finished album had been delivered to Rykodisc for release. However, when DreamWorks got involved, some songs were remixed, two songs were added to the track list ("Lilah", "Hanging on a Curtain"), and one song was removed ("In Your Shoes"). The latter remains officially unreleased. The album's planned October 1996 release date was eventually pushed back to March 1997.

Although Like Swimming became Morphine's highest-charting album in the US (No. 67), it failed to produce a commercial breakthrough. As of 1999, the album had sold 141,000 copies in United States, whereas Cure for Pain (1993) and Yes (1995) sold a combined 661,000 copies.

The album shares its name with a Mark Sandman side project that released the 7" single "Swing It Low" in 1996. "Swing It Low" was rerecorded for Like Swimming.

The music video for the single "Early to Bed" earned a Grammy nomination for Best Short Form Music Video.

== Critical reception ==
Professional ratings
Review scores
Source	Rating
AllMusic	3/5 stars
NME	7/10
Pitchfork	4.0/10
Rolling Stone	3/5 stars

Pitchfork's Ryan Schreiber said "It's not really that the quality of the songs have deteriorated, it's just that it all sounds the same. They desperately need to alter their sound ... after four identical records." Ira Robbins, writing for Rolling Stone, concurred, saying, "Four albums in, the band is riding the same sound like a slot car; even the welcome flashes of instrumental variety ... don't lead the band far from its usual track." Robbins felt that some tracks have "a hell of a groove" and show off the band's dynamic control, but ultimately "too many songs swagger in place, pumping a single line or riff with static electricity." AllMusic's Greg Prato felt that although the album has its highlights, it's not as strong as Morphine's previous albums, writing, "Some of the material doesn't sound fully developed, almost as if the Boston trio was rushed to complete the album."

Writing positively about the album, MTV's Seth Mnookin wrote, "Sounding as complete and essential as Cure for Pain and containing some of the kick-ass riffs that were scattered through-out Yes, Like Swimming is Morphine's best album yet." Trouser Press was also positive, noting the album's many "adventurous" and rock-oriented songs, which they felt ended claims "that the group's setup was intrinsically limited."

== Track listing ==
All tracks are written by Mark Sandman.

1. "Lilah" (instrumental) – 0:59
2. "Potion" – 2:00
3. "I Know You (Pt. III)" – 3:31
4. "Early to Bed" – 2:57
5. "Wishing Well" – 3:32
6. "Like Swimming" – 4:00
7. "Murder for the Money" – 3:34
8. "French Fries with Pepper" – 2:53
9. "Empty Box" – 3:54
10. "Eleven O'Clock" – 3:19
11. "Hanging on a Curtain" – 3:48
12. "Swing It Low" – 3:16

Japanese edition bonus track

13. "Open Up the Window" (instrumental) – 2:22

== Personnel ==
Adapted from the album liner notes.

Morphine

- Mark Sandman – vocals, 2-string slide bass, tritar, keyboards, Mellotron, guitar
- Dana Colley – baritone and tenor saxophone, bass saxophone on "Eleven O'Clock", double sax on "Wishing Well", backing vocals on "Murder for the Money" and "French Fries with Pepper"
- Billy Conway – drums, percussion, backing vocals on "Murder for the Money"

Additional musicians

- Mike Rivard – double bass on "Lilah" and "Empty Box"
- Larry Dersch – drums on "Like Swimming"
- Melissa Gibbs, Meredith Byam, Deborah J. Klein – backing vocals on "Murder for the Money"

Technical

- Mark Sandman – producer, engineer, mixing
- Paul Q. Kolderie – producer, engineer, mixing
- Matthew Ellard – engineer, mixing
- Carl Plaster – engineer
- Jon Williams – engineer
- Greg Calbi – mastering
- Morphine, Eric Pfeiffer, Robert Fisher – design
- Danny Clinch – cover photography

== Charts ==
Chart performance for Like Swimming
Chart (1997)	Peak position
Australian Albums (ARIA)	82
US Billboard 200	67
