= Kerouac: Kicks Joy Darkness =

Studio album by Various Artists
- Released: April 8, 1997
- Genre: Spoken word
- Length: 79:30
- Label: Rykodisc
- Producer: Jim Sampas

Kerouac: Kicks Joy Darkness is a 1997 spoken word tribute album released through Rykodisc featuring late Beat Generation writer Jack Kerouac's work performed by various artists. Notable performers include: Michael Stipe, Allen Ginsberg, Hunter S. Thompson, Johnny Depp, and Patti Smith. Seven out of the twenty-five tracks are strictly spoken word pieces, while the rest feature music.

== Background ==
Kerouac: Kicks Joy Darkness was produced by Jim Sampas, a musician in Boston-area bands, whose aunt was married to Jack Kerouac. Sonic Youth's Lee Ranaldo was brought on board as associate producer, and he enlisted Thurston Moore, Eddie Vedder, Michael Stipe, and others to the project. Sampas said of the Kerouac work chosen for the album, "The mainstream books are more appealing, more accessible, but we wanted to do things people hadn't heard before, open people's eyes to work never published before." Through literary executor John Sampas, previously unpublished material was made available.

The album contains two tracks not written by Kerouac: album opener "Kerouac," performed by rock band Morphine, and "Letter to William S. Burroughs" / "Ode to Jack," in which gonzo-journalist Hunter S. Thompson departs from Kerouac's text to recite his own "Ode to Jack."

Poets Allen Ginsberg and Lawrence Ferlinghetti were recorded live at the New York University Kerouac tribute at Town Hall in 1995. Ginsberg's performance of "The Brooklyn Bridge Blues" is missing the final tenth chorus. This was due to a faxing machine error which stuck the last pages together when Ginsberg was faxed the lyrics. The final chorus is read by musician Eric Andersen instead, recorded on a DAT recorder from the Brooklyn Bridge. Singer Patti Smith's performance with guitarists Thurston Moore and Lenny Kaye was recorded live at the Lowell Celebrates Kerouac Festival in 1995.

The majority of the texts are taken from Pomes All Sizes (1992), except "Letter to William S. Burroughs" and "Letter to John Clellon Holmes," which are from Jack Kerouac: Selected Letters, Vol. 1, 1940–1956 (1995), "MacDougal Street Blues" is from Book of Blues (1995), and "Madroad Driving..." and "Have You Ever Seen Anyone Like Cody Pomeray?" are from Visions of Cody (1972). "Dream: "Us Kids Swim off a Gray Pier...", "America's New Trinity of Love: Dean, Brando, Presley", "Dream: "On a Sunny Afternoon...", and "The Brooklyn Bridge Blues" are previously unpublished.

== Critical reception ==
Professional ratings
Review scores
| Source | Rating |
|---|---|
| AllMusic | 4/5 stars |
| Entertainment Weekly | B+ |

William Ruhlmann, writing for AllMusic, wrote in his review: "Kerouac was not a fan of rock music, instead preferring bebop jazz, so the closest tracks to what he himself would have preferred are associate producer and Sonic Youth member Lee Ranaldo's excerpt from a letter to John Clellon Holmes, accompanied by saxophonist Dana Colley, Warren Zevon's "Running Through – Chinese Poem Song," accompanied by pianist Michael Wolff, and Matt Dillon's "Mexican Loneliness," with a jazzy sax and bongo accompaniment ... The selections present a good sampling of Kerouac's literary concerns, and, whether appropriate or not, the recordings demonstrate his extensive influence."

== Track listing ==
All lyrics are written by Jack Kerouac, except where noted.

| No. | Title | Lyrics | Music | Performer | Length |
|---|---|---|---|---|---|
| 1. | "Kerouac" | Mark Sandman | Sandman, Billy Conway | Morphine | 2:54 |
| 2. | "Bowery Blues" | | (spoken word) | Lydia Lunch | 1:55 |
| 3. | "My Gang" | | Michael Stipe | Michael Stipe | 2:23 |
| 4. | "Dream: "Us Kids Swim off a Gray Pier..." | | (spoken word) | Steven Tyler | 1:34 |
| 5. | "Letter to William S. Burroughs" / "Ode to Jack" | Hunter S. Thompson ("Ode to Jack") | (spoken word) | Hunter S. Thompson | 1:41 |
| 6. | "Skid Row Wine" | | Mark Ashwill, Tim Bradlee, Bill Bronson, Louis Echavarria, Maggie Estep | Maggie Estep and the Spitters | 5:51 |
| 7. | "America's New Trinity of Love: Dean, Brando, Presley" | | (spoken word) | Richard Lewis | 6:06 |
| 8. | "Dream: "On a Sunny Afternoon..." | | Helium | Lawrence Ferlinghetti and Helium | 2:04 |
| 9. | "MacDougal Street Blues" | | Joe Strummer | Jack Kerouac and Joe Strummer | 2:48 |
| 10. | "The Brooklyn Bridge Blues" (choruses 1-9) | | (spoken word) | Allen Ginsberg | 5:47 |
| 11. | "Hymn" | | Eddie Vedder | Eddie Vedder, Campbell 2000 and Sadie 7 | 3:12 |
| 12. | "Old Western Movies" | | Tomandandy | William S. Burroughs and Tomandandy | 2:32 |
| 13. | "Silly Goofball Poems" | | Gregory A. Hormel | Juliana Hatfield | 4:02 |
| 14. | "The Moon" | | John Cale | John Cale | 3:01 |
| 15. | "Madroad Driving..." | | Come | Johnny Depp and Come | 3:28 |
| 16. | "Have You Ever Seen Anyone Like Cody Pomeray?" | | (spoken word) | Robert Hunter | 3:48 |
| 17. | "Letter to John Clellon Holmes" | | Dana Colley, Lee Ranaldo | Lee Ranaldo and Dana Colley | 2:36 |
| 18. | "Pome on Doctor Sax" | | Anna Domino | Anna Domino | 1:45 |
| 19. | "Mexico Rooftop" | | Rob Buck, Danny Chauvin | Rob Buck and Danny Chauvin | 1:25 |
| 20. | "The Last Hotel" | | Patti Smith | Patti Smith with Thurston Moore and Lenny Kaye | 3:47 |
| 21. | "Running Through–Chinese Poem Song" | | Michael Wolff | Warren Zevon and Michael Wolff | 3:34 |
| 22. | "Woman" | | Anton Sanko, Lee Ranaldo, Lenny Kaye | Jim Carroll with Lee Ranaldo, Lenny Kaye and Anton Sanko | 2:25 |
| 23. | "Loneliness, Mexican" | | Joey Altruda, Joe Gonzalez, Pablo Calogero | Matt Dillon with Joey Altruda, Joe Gonzalez and Pablo Calogero | 3:19 |
| 24. | "Angel Mine" | | Inger Lorre | Inger Lorre and Jeff Buckley | 5:24 |
| 25. | "The Brooklyn Bridge Blues" (chorus 10) | | (spoken word) | Eric Andersen | 1:59 |

== Personnel ==
Adapted from the album liner notes.

Morphine – "Kerouac"

- Mark Sandman – vocals, recording, mixing
- Billy Conway – drums
- Recorded and mixed at Hi-N-Dry, Cambridge, MA.

Lydia Lunch – "Bowery Blues"

- Lydia Lunch – vocals, recording

Michael Stipe – "My Gang"

- Michael Stipe – vocals, organ
- Tom Lewis – recording, mixing
- Recorded and mixed at Rockit Studios, Athens, GA.

Steven Tyler – "Dream: "Us Kids Swim off a Gray Pier..."

- Steven Tyler – vocals, a cappella background vocals
- Kevin Shirley – recording, mixing
- Rory Romano – assistant engineer
- Recorded and mixed at Avatar Studios, New York City, NY.

Hunter S. Thompson – "Letter to William S. Burroughs" / "Ode to Jack"

- Hunter S. Thompson – vocals
- Recorded October 18, 1996, Woody Creek, CO.

Maggie Estep and the Spitters – "Skid Row Wine"

- Maggie Estep – vocals
- Mark Ashwill – vocals
- Tim Bradlee – guitar
- Bill Bronson – bass
- Louis Echavarria – drums
- Ingo Krauss – recording, mixing
- Roy Mayorga – recording, mixing
- Sal Mormando – assistant engineer
- Recorded and mixed at Harold Dessau Studios, New York City, NY.

Richard Lewis – "America's New Trinity Of Love: Dean, Brando, Presley"

- Richard Lewis – vocals
- Daniel Messerli – recording, mixing
- Recorded and mixed in Los Angeles, CA

Lawrence Ferlinghetti and Helium – "Dream: "On a Sunny Afternoon..."

- Lawrence Ferlinghetti – vocals
- Mary Timony – vocals, keyboards, xylophone, mixing
- Ash Bowie – guitar
- Shawn Devlin – percussion
- Dan McLaughlin – recording (Helium), mixing
- Owen Burkett – recording (Helium)
- Ann Pope – recording (Helium)
- David Cook – recording (Lawrence Ferlinghetti)
- Jim Sampas – mixing
- Recorded on June 6, 1995, Town Hall, New York City, by Nevessa Productions Mobile Recording Studio. Helium recorded and mixed at Fort Apache, Cambridge, MA.

Jack Kerouac and Joe Strummer – "MacDougal Street Blues"

- Jack Kerouac – vocals
- Joe Strummer – synthesizer, guitar, bass, recording (music), mixing
- Richard Norris – drum machine
- Recorded in New York City circa late 1950s. Music recorded and mixed in The Woodshed, Heckfield, England.

Allen Ginsberg – "Brooklyn Bridge Blues" (choruses 1-9)

- Allen Ginsberg – vocals
- David Cook – recording
- Chris Anderson – mixing
- Jim Sampas – mixing
- Recorded on June 6, 1995, Town Hall, New York City, by Nevessa Productions Mobile Recording Studio. Mixed at Nevessa, Woodstock, NY.

Eddie Vedder, Campbell 2000 and Sadie 7 – "Hymn"

- Eddie Vedder – vocals
- Campbell 2000 – guitar
- Sadie 7 – bass
- 13 Anthony – recording, mixing
- Recorded and mixed in Seattle, WA.

William S. Burroughs and Tomandandy – "Old Western Movies"

- William Burroughs – vocals
- Tom Hajdu – keyboards
- Andy Milburn – keyboards
- James Liebow – guitar
- John Patatucci – double bass
- Gil Goldstein – accordion
- Bashiri Johnson – percussion
- John Arrucci – percussion
- Brian Smith – recording, mixing
- Jerry Gottus – recording, mixing

Juliana Hatfield – "Silly Goofball Pomes"

- Juliana Hatfield – vocals
- Gregory Hormel – guitar
- David Cook – recording, mixing
- Recorded and mixed at Fort Apache, Cambridge, MA.

John Cale – "The Moon"

- John Cale – vocals, keyboards, recording, mixing
- Recorded and mixed at John Cale's recording studio in Greenwich Village, New York City, NY.

Johnny Depp and Come – "Madroad Driving..."

- Johnny Depp – vocals
- Thalia Zedek – guitar, clarinet, vibraslap
- Chris Brokaw – guitar, Marxophone
- Tara Jane O'Neil – bass (special guest)
- Kevin Coultas – drums, percussion (special guest)
- Bruce Witkin – recording, mixing (Johnny Depp)
- Tim O'Heir – recording, mixing (Come)
- Recorded and mixed at The Garage, Los Angeles, CA. Come recorded and mixed at Fort Apache, Cambridge, MA.

Robert Hunter – "Have You Ever Seen Anyone Like Cody Pomeray?..."

- Robert Hunter – vocals, recording
- Jack Kerouac – background scat singing (playing on cassette player)
- Recorded on the road.

Lee Ranaldo and Dana Colley – "Letter to John Clellon Holmes"

- Lee Ranaldo – vocals, tapes
- Dana Colley – saxophone, mixing
- Pete Weiss – recording, mixing
- Jim Sampas – mixing
- Recorded at Pete Weiss' apartment in Brookline, MA. Mixed at Zippah Studios, Brookline, MA.

Anna Domino – "Pome on Doctor Sax"

- Anna Domino – vocals, keyboards, recording
- Recorded and mixed at Light of Day Studios, New York City, NY.

Rob Buck and Danny Chauvin – "Mexico Rooftop"

- Danny Chauvin – vocals
- Rob Buck – guitar
- Tony White – saxophone
- Recorded at Avalon Studios, Long Island, NY.

Patti Smith with Thurston Moore and Lenny Kaye – "The Last Hotel"

- Patti Smith – vocals, guitar
- Thurston Moore – guitar
- Lenny Kaye – guitar
- Lonnie Bedell – recording, mixing
- Recorded and mixed at the Lowell Celebrates Kerouac Festival 1995, the Smith Baker Center, Lowell, MA.

Warren Zevon and Michael Wolff – "Running Through–Chinese Poem Song"

- Warren Zevon – vocals
- Michael Wolff – piano
- Duncan Aldrich – recording
- Recorded at Pollywood Studios, Hollywood, CA.

Jim Carroll with Lee Ranaldo, Lenny Kaye and Anton Sanko – "Woman"

- Jim Carroll – vocals
- Lee Ranaldo – guitar
- Lenny Kaye – guitar
- Anton Sanko – keyboards
- Warton Tears – recording, mixing
- Recorded and mixed at Fun City, New York City, NY.

Matt Dillon with Joey Altruda, Joe Gonzalez and Pablo Calogero – "Mexican Loneliness"

- Matt Dillon – vocals
- Joey Altruda – bass
- Pablo Calogero – saxophone
- Joe Gonzalez – percussion
- Danny Caccavo – recording, mixing
- Recorded and mixed at This Way Studios, New York City, NY.

Inger Lorre and Jeff Buckley – "Angel Mine"

- Inger Lorre – vocals, guitar, keyboards
- Jeff Buckley – guitar, sitar, mouth saxophone
- Hillary Johnson – recording, mixing
- Recorded and mixed at Spa Recording Studios, New York City, NY.

Eric Andersen – "Brooklyn Bridge Blues" (chorus 10)

- Eric Andersen – vocals, recording
- Recorded on the Brooklyn Bridge, New York City, NY.

Technical

- Jim Sampas – producer
- Lee Ranaldo – associate producer
- Danny Caccavo – mastering
- Allen Ginsberg – photography
- Barbara Longo – package design
