= Bootleg Detroit =

Live album by Morphine
- Released: September 26, 2000
- Recorded: March 7, 1994
- Venue: St. Andrew's Hall, Detroit, Michigan
- Genre: Alternative rock, jazz rock
- Label: Rykodisc

Morphine chronology
The Night (2000)	Bootleg Detroit (2000)	The Best of Morphine: 1992–1995 (2003)

Professional ratings
Review scores
Source	Rating
AllMusic	3/5 stars
Pitchfork Media	(8.3/10)

Bootleg Detroit is the only authorized release of a live recording of Morphine. It was released on the label Rykodisc in September 2000. Recorded by Alan J. Schmit—a fan—on March 7, 1994, at St. Andrew’s Hall in Detroit, Michigan, it was edited and mixed under Mark Sandman’s supervision. He also laid out and delivered the low-fi artwork for the album prior to the band’s final tour in Italy. A deluxe remastered edition was released in 2025 that includes the full concert.

The enhanced CD contains concert footage of "Cure for Pain" and "The Saddest Song", recorded at the Montreux Jazz Festival in 1995.

== Track listing ==
=== Original Release ===
All tracks are written by Mark Sandman.

1. "Intro"
2. "Come Along"
3. "Dana Intro"
4. "Mary Won't You Call My Name?"
5. "Banter 1"
6. "Candy"
7. "Sheila"
8. "Billy Intro"
9. "Claire"
10. "My Brain"
11. "Banter 2"
12. "A Head with Wings"
13. "Cure for Pain"
14. "You Speak My Language"
15. "Thursday"
16. "Banter 3"
17. "You Look Like Rain"
18. "Buena"

=== Deluxe 2025 Remastered ===
1. "DJ Intro"
2. "Have a Lucky Day"
3. "Pulled Over the Car"
4. "Fur Bikini"
5. "All Wrong"
6. "Mark Sandman Intro"
7. "Come Along"
8. "Dana Intro"
9. "Mary Won't You Call My Name?"
10. "Banter 1"
11. "Candy"
12. "Sheila"
13. "Billy Intro"
14. "Claire"
15. "My Brain"
16. "Sharks"
17. "Banter 2"
18. "A Head with Wings"
19. "Goddess"
20. "Cure for Pain"
21. "You Speak My Language"
22. "Thursday"
23. "Banter 3"
24. "You Look Like Rain"
25. "Buena"
26. "Radar"

== Personnel ==
Morphine

- Mark Sandman – vocals, 2-string slide bass
- Dana Colley – baritone saxophone, tenor saxophone, double saxophone, vocals
- Billy Conway – drums

Technical personnel

- Phil Davidson – front of house sound engineer for Morphine
- Toby Mountain – mastering
- Brian Dunton – premastering
