= Q Division =

Q Division may refer to:

- Q Division (James Bond)
- Q Division Records
- Q Division Studios
- the q-analog of regular division in Tsallis q-theory
