= Cocktail drum =

Portable drum kit

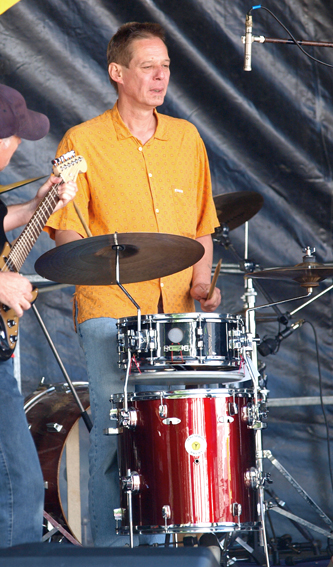
Cocktail drum kit played by Yves Bischoff of Les Bletz, 2009

Cocktail drums are a type of portable drum kit that combines bass drum and snare drum sounds in a single drum.

== History ==
Cocktail drums were first put into production in the 1940s with the Carlton combo kit, consisting of a vertical 20 inch bass drum, a snare drum, cymbal and other assorted percussion.

In some episodes of I Love Lucy (1951–57), Ricky Ricardo's band featured a man playing one (according to cocktail drummer Billy Conway).

Eventually the companies Slingerland, Ludwig-Musser and Gretsch began producing cocktail drums that are more similar to what is used today. The typical drum consisted of a floor tom that was 14 inches in diameter and 24 to 26 inches tall, with both top and bottom drumheads. The bottom head was struck via a foot-pedal-operated beater and tuned to achieve a bass drum sound. The top head was struck with sticks. The top head is also fitted with a snare underneath to achieve a snare drum sound. The drum's height would normally require the musician to play it standing upright with one foot operating the pedal and one foot bearing the weight of the musician's body (as opposed to a trap set that is played sitting down). This made the drum quite easy to move from place to place, as opposed to moving a snare drum, stand for the snare drum, stool and bass drum for a trap set. However the tradeoff for this ease of transportation is the practice and balance required to play the instrument that is unnecessary when playing a trap set. It can also be played sitting down via a Bar stool.

== Modern use ==
Use of cocktail sets in modern music remains relatively rare but does remain a viable alternative for drummers looking to maximize portability and/or minimize stage space normally taken by the drum set. It is also useful as an alternative to a traditional drum set for providing a "retro" or "off-beat" appearance to a group.

Some more modern cocktail drums are fitted with a baffle. The baffle is of a non-resonant material to prevent the bottom head's vibration from interacting with and "buzzing" the snare, which creates a sound much closer to that of two separate drums. Others use a small snare drum that is clamped or mounted in some fashion to the cocktail drum. This leaves the top head free to be used as a tom with the snares removed. The clamp provides the musician with a secure place for the snare drum without the added inconvenience of using a snare drum stand. Using two separate drums in this manner makes both drums easier to tune and provides much more consistent sound.

Holders for cymbals, tom drums, cowbells and other various percussion instruments can be mounted to the cocktail drum depending on the musicians' needs. This makes the instrument very personal and few cocktail drums today are alike.

=== Notable players ===
- Drummer Steve Jordan plays his own Steve Jordan cocktail set professionally with various groups.
- Peter Erskine also plays the Yamaha Club Jordan cocktail drum. However, he plays it sitting on a high drum throne.
- Mick Fleetwood of Fleetwood Mac is known to play cocktail drum kits.
- Slim Jim Phantom of the Stray Cats plays a bass drum/snare drum set standing up in the traditional "cocktail" manner. He plays all concerts standing with this type of set.
- Rob Hirst of Midnight Oil plays a Ludwig Cocktail kit during the acoustic portions of Midnight Oil's set.
- Bernie Dresel of the Brian Setzer Orchestra plays a DW brand cocktail drum during a trio set (guitar, bass and drums) at most concerts.
- Gilson Lavis of Squeeze Performs with Jools Holland's BBC television show with a Metropolitan Cocktail Drum.
- Dave Hartman of Southern Culture on the Skids.
- Alex Hodgson of The Last Resort.
- The Raveonettes use a Cocktail Set when they are on tour.
- Crash LaResh drummer for The Dexter Romweber Duo/Flat Duo Jets from 1995 to 2007.
- Sonny Brown drummer for retro-country band, The Ride, plays a modified Peace Manhattan cocktail drum kit.
- Travis Barker of Blink-182.
- Billy Conway played a cocktail drum in the blues-rock band Treat Her Right. He used it occasionally for Morphine and Orchestra Morphine, in which he more often played a somewhat fuller kit. Sometimes with Morphine, Jerome Deupree plays on a regular drum set alongside Conway's cocktail drums.
- Yves Bischoff of Swiss group Les Bletz plays a custom cocktail drum (pictured above).
- Tommy Larkins plays a cocktail kit with Jonathan Richman during performances.
- Thumpin' Scott Comet Master Drummer of Soulbeatz Oakland plays a Gretsch cocktail kit.
- Peter Furler of the Newsboys did a drum battle with Duncan Phillips In the Go tour while using a DW cocktail kit.
