= Yes (Morphine album) =

1995 studio album by Morphine

Studio album by Morphine
- Released: March 21, 1995
- Recorded: 1994–1995
- Studios: Fort Apache; Q-Division; Hi-N-Dry; Hell West; Outpost; KCRW; Bullet Sound
- Genre: Alternative rock
- Length: 36:52
- Label: Rykodisc
- Producers: Mark Sandman; Paul Q. Kolderie

Morphine chronology
Cure for Pain (1993)	Yes (1995)	Like Swimming (1997)

Yes is the third studio album by alternative rock band Morphine, released in March 1995. It was their first album to make the Billboard Top 200, but fared less well abroad than its predecessor. As of February 1997 it has sold 156,000 copies in United States according to Nielsen SoundScan.

== Critical reception ==
Professional ratings
Review scores
Source	Rating
AllMusic	4.5/5 stars
Entertainment Weekly	B+
The Guardian	4/4 stars
Q	4/5 stars
Rolling Stone	4/5 stars
USA Today	3.5/4 stars

In a retrospective review, AllMusic's Greg Prato felt that on Yes Morphine had moved away from the more "accessible direction" they had introduced on 1994's Cure for Pain for a more "challenging (but just as rewarding) direction." He found Yes to be "just a shade less spectacular than Cure for Pain, but certainly not by much."

== Track listing ==
All tracks are written by Mark Sandman, except as noted.

No.	Title	Writer(s)	Length
1.	"Honey White"		3:06
2.	"Scratch"		3:13
3.	"Radar"		3:28
4.	"Whisper"		3:28
5.	"Yes"		2:00
6.	"All Your Way"		3:04
7.	"Super Sex"		3:53
8.	"I Had My Chance"		3:05
9.	"The Jury"	Morphine, Frank Howard Swart	2:07
10.	"Sharks"		2:22
11.	"Free Love"		4:14
12.	"Gone for Good"		2:52

Japanese edition bonus track
No.	Title	Length
13.	"Pulled Over the Car"	2:56

Notes

- Track 8 recorded live at KCRW, Santa Monica, California, January 1994, for Morning Becomes Eclectic.
- Track 10 recorded live at Bullet Sound Studios, Nederhorst den Berg, the Netherlands, May 1994, for 2 Meter Sessies, NOS/VARA TV.

=== 2018 vinyl expanded edition ===
In 2018, Yes became the first release in the Run Out Groove label's vinyl-only Cornerstones series and included a bonus record of Yes-era B-sides, unreleased outtakes from the Yes sessions and unreleased live broadcast recordings, all remastered from the original source tapes.

- side one (1-6) and two (7-12) as per original album

Side three
No.	Title	Lyrics	Music	Length
1.	"Pulled Over the Car" (from Japanese version of Yes)			3:00
2.	"Come Along" (studio version; previously unreleased outtake from the Yes sessions)			4:49
3.	"Radar" (long version; previously unreleased outtake from the Yes sessions)			4:11
4.	"Birthday Cake" (from "Super Sex" single)	Sandman	Morphine, Swart	2:03
5.	"Super Sex" (alternate mix; previously unreleased outtake from the Yes sessions)			4:07
6.	"Sundayafternoonweightlessness" (instrumental) (from "Super Sex" single)		Morphine	4:56

Side four
No.	Title	Length
7.	"Have a Lucky Day" (live; previously unreleased)	4:23
8.	"Whisper" (live; previously unreleased)	4:04
9.	"Thursday" (live; previously unreleased)	3:27
10.	"Shame/Free Love" (live; previously unreleased)	7:14

Notes

- Track 4 recorded live at Hell West, San Francisco, California; recording and lead bass by Frank Swart.
- Track 6 recorded live at Hi-N-Dry, Cambridge, Massachusetts; recording and production by Mark Sandman.
- Tracks 7–10 recording date and location not listed.

== Personnel ==
Adapted from the album liner notes.

Morphine

- Mark Sandman – vocals, 2-string slide bass, piano (4), Chamberlin (7), tritar (7), guitar (12)
- Dana Colley – baritone saxophone, tenor saxophone (4, 9, 10), doublesax (3, 7)
- Billy Conway – drums

Additional musicians

- Frank Howard Swart – wah bass (9)

Technical

- Mark Sandman – producer, engineer (12), mixing (6, 7, 9, 12), front cover photography
- Paul Q. Kolderie – producer, engineer (2–4, 6, 7, 11), mixing (1–5, 11)
- Mike Denneen – engineer (1, 5, 7)
- Tim O'Heir – engineer (6, 7)
- Scott Fritz – engineer (8)
- Frank Howard Swart – engineer (9), mixing (9)
- Han Nuyten – engineer (10)
- Truman Stiles – mixing (6, 7)
- Phil Davidson – mixing (8, 10)
- Toby Mountain – mastering
- Robin Spencer – design

== Charts ==
=== Weekly charts ===
Chart (1995)	Peak position
Australian Albums (ARIA)	73
Belgian Albums (Ultratop Flanders)	16
Belgian Albums (Ultratop Wallonia)	17
New Zealand Albums (RMNZ)	40
Norwegian Albums (VG-lista)	38
US Billboard 200	101

=== Year-end charts ===
Chart (1995)	Position
Belgian Albums (Ultratop Flanders)	77
