= Silver Gorilla =

Studio album by the Gravel Pit
- Released: 1999
- Studio: Q Division
- Genre: Power pop
- Length: 41:29
- Label: Q Division
- Producer: Mike Denneen

The Gravel Pit chronology
| Favorite EP (1998) | Silver Gorilla (1999) | Mass Avenue Freeze Out (2001) |

Silver Gorilla is the third studio album by the American band the Gravel Pit, released in 1999. It was nominated for three Boston Music Awards. The band supported the album with a North American tour.

== Production ==
The album was produced by Mike Denneen. Among the album's guest musicians are Jen Trynin, Kay Hanley, and John Linnell. Silver Gorilla includes a three-song suite, tracks 10–12, dubbed "An American Trilogy". Many of the album's songs had been in the band's live set for years.

== Critical reception ==
Professional ratings
Review scores
| Source | Rating |
|---|---|
| AllMusic | 4/5 stars |
| Entertainment Weekly | A− |

Entertainment Weekly praised the "power and prowess of this Boston quartet, whose inordinately catchy Farfisa-streaked pop is instantly familiar yet, in this age of alternanonymous posing, remarkably daring." The Austin Chronicle thought that "the Pit explodes with the furor of Elvis Costello's first few sneering albums and brims with the pure pop perfection of the rest." The Boston Herald called the album "hard-edged pop that's aggressively tuneful."

The New Yorker deemed the album "highly inventive organ-fuelled pop," and noted the "clever lyrics, catchy melodies, and arrangements that are more complex than you'd expect." Trouser Press concluded that, "for all of the pushing of musical boundaries, Silver Gorilla contains the Pit’s most accessible straight-ahead pop song, 'Favorite'... Sailing along on a bouncy organ groove, it became a genuine hit in Boston." The Cleveland Scene opined that the band provides "melodic yet rough-edged tunes that falter only occasionally, when the song gets lost in repetitive chord changes."

AllMusic wrote that "this Boston foursome's loud pop-punk recalls the early days of Cheap Trick, when loud (not just fuzzy, but loud) guitars could exist in catchy pop songs."

== Track listing ==
| No. | Title | Length |
|---|---|---|
| 1. | "I Climb (Up His Tree)" | 2:20 |
| 2. | "Bolt of Light" | 4:23 |
| 3. | "The Mosquito" | 3:28 |
| 4. | "Where the Flying Things Go" | 2:59 |
| 5. | "Stumbling Sideways" | 3:08 |
| 6. | "Favorite" | 3:01 |
| 7. | "Free to Be Me and Thee" | 1:43 |
| 8. | "When Will Our Bucket Come Up Dry" | 3:37 |
| 9. | "Millions of Miles" | 2:21 |
| 10. | "The Ballad of Ezra Messenger" | 3:17 |
| 11. | "The Rise of Abimelech DuMont" | 3:54 |
| 12. | "The Marchers Wander In" | 3:31 |
| 13. | "Get Tangled!" | 3:40 |

== Personnel ==
The Gravel Pit

- Jed Parish – vocals, organ
- Lucky Jackson – guitar, backing vocals
- Ed Valauskas – bass, backing vocals
- Pete Caldes – drums, backing vocals

Additional personnel

- The Aqua Vulvas – backing vocals(2, 8, 10)
- Jamie Arentzen – baritone saxophone and organ(3)
- Jon Lupfer – tenor saxophone(3)
- Joe McMahon – upright bass(12)
- John Linnell – baritone saxophone(13)
- Richard Marr – vocals(13)

Production

- Mike Denneen – production, engineering, mixing
- Richard Marr – assistance
- Bruce MacFarlane – assistance
- Jamie Arentzen – assistance
- Josh Lattanzi – assistance
- Jessica Everett – assistance
- Christina Files – assistance
- Jonathan Wyner – mastering
- Roberto Toledo – mastering assistance
