= Gravel (disambiguation) =

Gravel is a type of rock.

Gravel or Gravell may also refer to:

- Gravel (surname)
- Gravel pit, a mine for gravel
- Gravel bar, an accumulation of gravel-size sediment in a river
- River gravel, a subtype of gravel stone
- Aquarium gravel, the common name for an aquarium's substrate
- Gravel road, a type of road
- Gravel disease, the archaic name of kidney stones
- Gravel mine, a type of weapon
- Gravel cycling, a sport, or a leisure activity, in which participants ride bicycles mostly on gravel roads.
  - Gravel bicycle, a type of bicycle intended for gravel cycling.

== Places ==
- Gravel Ridge, Arkansas, town
- Gravel Springs, Virginia, community
- Queenstown Oval, Tasmania, also known as the Gravel, a gravel-surfaced football field in Queenstown, Tasmania

== Music and entertainment ==
- "Gravel Pit", a song by Wu-Tang Clan
- The Gravel Pit, band from Boston
- Gravel (Lithuanian band), band from Lithuania
- Gravel, personal and set-top media players by Commodore International Corporation
- Gravel (comics), an ongoing comic series written by Warren Ellis
- Gravel (video game), a 2018 racing video game

== Other ==
- A recreational drug sold as "gravel" or "flakka" (alpha-Pyrrolidinopentiophenone)
