= Good (Morphine album) =

1992 studio album by Morphine

Studio album by Morphine
- Released: September 8, 1992
- Recorded: 1991–1992
- Studios: The Outpost, Stoughton, Massachusetts; Q Division, Boston; Fort Apache, Cambridge, Massachusetts; High-N-Dry, Cambridge, Massachusetts
- Genre: Alternative rock
- Length: 37:53
- Labels: Accurate/Distortion; Rykodisc
- Producers: Mark Sandman; Paul Q. Kolderie; Tom Dubé

Morphine chronology
Good (1992)	Cure for Pain (1993)

Good is the first album by the Boston-based alternative rock trio Morphine. It was released in 1992 on the Accurate/Distortion label. It was reissued by Rykodisc in 1993 after the band signed with the label.

== Critical reception ==
Professional ratings
Review scores
Source	Rating
AllMusic	3/5 stars
The Encyclopedia of Popular Music	3/5 stars
MusicHound Rock: The Essential Album Guide	3/5 stars
(The New) Rolling Stone Album Guide	3/5 stars

Trouser Press wrote that the album "establishes the goods, excavating a slippery, sultry groove that suggests blues and bebop without becoming either by providing ample room in the spacious mix for two evocative voices." AllMusic wrote, "While it may not be as stellar as their future releases would be ... Good did a splendid job of introducing the Boston trio's highly original sound. While it was the alternative crowd who immediately latched onto Morphine, their music was geared more toward the jazz scene – a wailing saxophone, lead bass (played with a slide), and lyrics influenced by '50s beat poetry were all-important ingredients."

== Track listing ==
All tracks are written by Mark Sandman, except as noted.

No.	Title	Writer(s)	Length
1.	"Good"		2:36
2.	"The Saddest Song"		2:50
3.	"Claire"		3:07
4.	"Have a Lucky Day"		3:24
5.	"You Speak My Language"		3:25
6.	"You Look Like Rain"		3:42
7.	"Do Not Go Quietly unto Your Grave"		3:21
8.	"Lisa"	Dana Colley	0:43
9.	"The Only One"		2:42
10.	"Test-Tube Baby/Shoot'm Down"		3:11
11.	"The Other Side"	Sandman, Colley	3:50
12.	"I Know You (Part I)"		2:17
13.	"I Know You (Part II)"		2:45

Japanese edition bonus track

No.	Title	Length
9.	"Shame" (between "Lisa" and "The Only One")	2:44

=== 2020 vinyl expanded edition ===
On September 9, 2019, the Run Out Groove label announced that Good had been voted as their next vinyl rerelease and would include a bonus record of unreleased tracks remastered from the original source tapes. It was released on January 17, 2020.

- side one (1-6) and two (7-13) as per original album

Side three
No.	Title	Writer(s)	Length
1.	"Where's the Sun Go"		1:37
2.	"Shame"		2:43
3.	"The Only One" (live radio broadcast)		3:10
4.	"If You Live"	Mose Allison	3:54
5.	"Mom Bomb"		1:01
6.	"The Old Days (It's Not Like That Anymore)"		4:38

Side four
No.	Title	Length
7.	"Let's Dance" (Mark voice message) "Come Over" (early version)	0:17; 2:13
8.	"The Saddest Song" (alternate version)	4:03
9.	"Mona's Sister" (alternate version; with Treat Her Right)	3:27
10.	"You're Worse — Looking Good" (edited rehearsal recording)	2:18
11.	"Test-Tube Baby/Shoot'm Down" (longer alternate version)	4:36
12.	"Yes idea" "Morphine gig ad" (Mark voice message)	1:13; 0:29

Notes

- All tracks on side three and four were recorded between 1989 and 1991. All tracks, except "Shame" and "Mona's Sister", are previously unreleased. "Shame" was released in 1993 as a B-side to the "Cure for Pain" single, and "Mona's Sister" was included on the 2004 box set Sandbox: The Mark Sandman Box Set.

== Personnel ==
Adapted from the album's liner notes.

Morphine

- Mark Sandman – vocals, 2-string slide bass, organ, guitar, tritar
- Dana Colley – baritone saxophone, other saxes, triangle, backing vocals on "You Look Like Rain"
- Jerome Deupree – drums

Additional musicians

- Billy Conway – drums on "You Speak My Language" and "You Look Like Rain"
- Jim Fitting – bass harmonica on "I Know You (Part I)"

Technical

- Mark Sandman – producer
- Paul Q. Kolderie – co-producer, engineer (1, 2, 4, 5, 7, 9, 10, 13)
- Tom Dubé – co-producer, engineer (3, 8, 11, 12)
- Mike Dineen – mixing (9)
- Toby Mountain – mastering
- Eric Pfeiffer – artwork

Notes

- Tracks 1, 2, 4, 5, 7, 9, 10 and 13 recorded at The Outpost.
- Tracks 3, 8, 11 and 12 recorded at Q Division and Fort Apache
- Track 6 recorded at High-N-Dry.
