= Jeremy Lyons =

American musician (born 1970)

- Jeremy Lyons performing in Buenos Aires, Argentina with Vapors of Morphine (2014)

Background information
- Born: March 24, 1970 (age 55); Ithaca, New York, United States
- Genres: Rockabilly; blues; New Orleans R&B
- Occupation(s): Musician, songwriter
- Instrument(s): Guitar, vocals, bass
- Years active: 1992–present

Jeremy Lyons (born March 24, 1970) is an American musician, currently based in Massachusetts.

== Musical career ==
Jeremy Lyons began his professional music career playing blues guitar and singing on the streets of New Orleans, and went on to make a name for himself in that town by blending elements of rockabilly and delta blues with the Deltabilly Boys. Subsequent to the disaster created by Hurricane Katrina, he resettled to the Boston area and eventually diversified his career to encompass rock, folk, jug band, children's music and education.

Lyons was born in Ithaca, New York, United States. As a teenager, he learned from friends and first studied guitar with British folk musician Martin Simpson in Ithaca. After moving to New Orleans in 1992, he made his living playing in the streets with the Big Mess Blues Band for five years. He immersed himself in the local scene, playing Delta blues, zydeco, Cajun, gospel, R&B, traditional New Orleans jazz, and Harlem swing.

Along with drummer Paul Santopadre and Greg Schatz, he founded the Deltabilly Boys. They played in the United States and Europe. Some of their albums included Count Your Chickens Before They Hatch (1999); Live at the Dragon’s Den; Death of a Street Singer; Live at Fribourg; and Jeremy Lyons and the Deltabilly Boys.

He moved to Boston in 2005, fleeing from the flooding caused by Hurricane Katrina. There he met Dana Colley, Jerome Deupree and Billy Conway from the then disbanded Morphine and they started playing together, informally at first. In 2009, Colley and Deupree formed Members of Morphine, on the occasion of the tenth anniversary of the sudden death of frontman Mark Sandman. Colley invited Lyons to play the two-string bass and sing in the newly formed band. The group later changed its name to Vapors of Morphine; they had for several years been playing weekly in Atwood’s Tavern, a small venue in Cambridge, Massachusetts, since the spring of 2009, until around 2015. The group has toured internationally, to South America, Europe, Russia and Australia.

Lyons also performs regularly for children at schools, libraries and special events. In 2014, he released a solo album called Make it Better, and beside his work with Vapors of Morphine.

Since 2015, Lyons has performed with increasing frequency with his group The Busted Jug Band, described on their website as "High Energy Music From the 20's and 30's played by men in top hats and derbies....a festive romp through time featuring group vocals, swinging rhythms and novel instrumentation. Inspired by the street bands of the early 20th Century, the group features kazoos, washboard, mandolin, banjo-uke, washtub bass, harmonica, accordion, jug, rhythm bones, National guitar, slide whistle and bicycle horns." The Busted Jug Band has released one eponymous CD and a "silent music video" of "When the Sun Goes Down in Harlem" by the Harlem Hamfats on YouTube. The band members all have stage names: Jeremy is known in the group as "Smiling Pee Wee Hernando; other members are "Rude Boy" (Rob Rudin), "Early Bird" (Mark Early), "Lefty Boom-Boom" (Den Poitras), and "Kayola O'La" (Kevin Byrne).
