= Dan Brenner =

American songwriter

Background information
- Born: Daniel Abraham Brenner; December 19, 1963 (age 62); New York City
- Genres: rock, Americana
- Instruments: Guitar, Bass, Piano, Drums
- Website: www.danbrennermusic.net

Dan Brenner (born Daniel Abraham Brenner, December 19, 1963) is an American composer, musician, and psychiatrist. Brenner was a member of the band Magnet, with Moe Tucker (former drummer in the Velvet Underground) in the late 1990s, and of the rap/performance-art band Razor Magnet with his brother, filmmaker Evan Brenner from 1985-1988. He was a member of the Boston bands Green Fuse and Gunga Din in the early 1990s, and prior to that, while a student at Harvard College, The Love Monsters. Brenner has written the scores for three feature films, including Rhythm Thief (Special Jury Prize at Sundance Film Festival, 1995), Spare Me (Priz Tournage winner Avignon Film Festival, 1993), and The Riddle (a.k.a. Sasha’s Riddle, winner Long Island Film Festival, 2010, official selection Toronto Film Festival 1997). Brenner also co-wrote the script for The Riddle, for which he was awarded the 2010 Mario Puzo Screenplay Award. Some of Brenner's film composition is credited as "Danny Brenner." He was as Producer on the Foggy Notion CD Mission.

In 2011, Brenner released a solo CD, Little Dark Angel, produced by 12-time Grammy Winner Jay Newland. Little Dark Angel featured Larry Campbell (guitar, pedal steel, banjo, fiddle, mandolin), Will Lee (bass), Shawn Pelton (drums), Brian Mitchell (keyboard, harmonica, and accordion), and former Morphine member Dana Colley (saxophone, bass clarinet). In 2016, Brenner released Tough, also produced by Jay Newland. Tough featured Dan Reiser (drums and percussion), Entcho Todorow (violin), Zev Katz (electric and acoustic bass), Adam Levy (acoustic, electric, baritone guitar), Dana Colley (clarinet), Glenn Patscha (piano, organ, accordion, harmonium, pump organ, backing vocals) Steve Williams: (additional percussion), Sherrod Barnes (guitar) Jay Newland (baritone guitar) and Dave Eggar (cello).

== Personal life ==
Dan Brenner was born in New York City, attended Saint Ann's School in Brooklyn Heights, and graduated from Harvard College. Brenner later attended medical school, and was a resident in Psychiatry at the Cambridge Hospital from 1995-2000. He was a Clinical Instructor in Psychiatry at Harvard Medical School from 1995-2010, and received psychoanalytic training at the Boston Psychoanalytic Society and Institute. He is Medical Director of Cambridge Biotherapies, in Cambridge, MA. He is married to Heather Thompson-Brenner.

== Discography ==
=== Solo ===
- 2014 Tough
- 2011 Little Dark Angel

=== Compilation ===
- 2010 Working on a Building (three songs)

=== Magnet ===
- 1999 Shark Bait (produced by David Lowery)
- 1998 Which Way
- 1997 Don’t Be A Penguin

=== Foggy Notion ===
- 1995 Mission

=== Razor Magnet ===
- 1990 You're In good Hands

=== Green Fuse ===
- 1987 Sleeping Dairy Death Dirge (7” EP)

I Have a copy of this record and it is a double EP (7") The actual songs are "Dairy Queen", "Sleeping Sara", "Death Dirge", and "Summertime" AND the date on it is 1988

=== The Love Monsters ===
- 1984 "Kiss Away The Tears" (7” EP)

== Filmography ==
=== Composer ===
- 2000 Wrist
- 1996 The Riddle (a.k.a. Sasha's Riddle)
- 1994 Rhythm Thief
- 1993 Spare Me
- 1993 Two Boneheads
- 1992 Breaking and Entering
- 1989 The Man Who Invented The Twinkie
- 1989 The Starving Song
- 1988 Doctor Fisher
- 1988 Santaphobia
- 1987 Waking Up Crazy
- 1987 Consumed

=== Screenwriter ===
- 1996 The Riddle (a.k.a. Sasha's Riddle)
- 1993 Two Bits
- 1988 Doctor Fisher

=== Acting ===
- 2005 In Loving Memory
- 2001 Works of Wonder
- 1988 Doctor Fisher
- 1985 Mister Brain
