= 28 Plastic Blue Versions of Endings Without You =

Studio album by Francine
- Released: February 4, 2003
- Recorded: Q Division Studios, Space 67, Moontower and Clayton's
- Genre: Rock music/>Indie
- Length: 44:43
- Label: Q Division Records
- Producer: John Dragonetti

Francine chronology
Forty on a Fall Day (2000)	28 Plastic Blue Versions of Endings Without You (2003)	Airshow (2006)

Professional ratings
Review scores
Source	Rating
Allmusic	3/5 stars

28 Plastic Blue Versions of Endings Without You is the second LP by the Boston band Francine. It was released on February 4, 2003, by Q Division Records. The album's subdued and personal tone is a departure from Francine's first album, Forty on a Fall Day. Francine played scattered shows in the northeast USA after the album's release but did not tour. Considering, that this album has both fantastic songs and "miscues", it was received with mixed reviews.

== Track listing ==
1. Technical Books
2. Inside Joke
3. Fake Fireplace Things
4. This Sunday's Revival
5. NASCAR
6. Albany Brownout
7. Silver Plated 606
8. Oxygenated
9. Ratmobile
10. Novelty
11. Uninstall
12. Chlorine
13. 13 Years

== Personnel ==
- Clayton Scoble - vocals, guitar, photography
- Albert Gualtieri - guitar
- Steve Scully - drums, vocals
- Sean Connelly - bass, background vocals
- John Dragonetti - producer
- Rafi Sofer - engineer
- Jeff Lipton - mastering
- Jay Walsh - art direction
