= Spanking the Monkey =

- Theatrical release poster
- Directed by: David O. Russell
- Written by: David O. Russell
- Produced by: Dean Silvers
- Starring: Jeremy Davies; Alberta Watson; Carla Gallo; Benjamin Hendrickson
- Cinematography: Michael Mayers
- Edited by: Pamela Martin
- Music by: David Carbonara
- Distributed by: Fine Line Features
- Release date: July 15, 1994
- Running time: 99 minutes
- Country: United States
- Language: English
- Budget: $200,000
- Box office: $1.4 million

Spanking the Monkey is a 1994 American black comedy film written and directed by David O. Russell. It was filmed in Pawling, New York.

== Plot ==
Ray Aibelli has finished his first year of college at the Massachusetts Institute of Technology. He is forced to forego a prestigious medical internship he earned to take care of his mother, Susan. She has suffered a leg injury keeping her homebound just as her husband, Tom, is about to leave for an extended period to work as a traveling salesman. Ray's relationship with his overly controlling father is troubled. His parents' relationship with each other is also strained. Susan often feels lonely and disappointed by a lack of achievement in life. Tom regularly cheats on her with sex workers.

Ray feels obliged to take care of his mother. While helping her shower, he glimpses her naked and experiences sexual attraction to her. This leads to a moment of mutually accepted intimacy when he massages her upper thigh. He feels extreme guilt for his incestuous feelings and rubs his skin raw to punish himself. His sexual frustration is exacerbated when while trying to masturbate he is unable to do so because the family's dog repeatedly interrupts him. He seeks refuge through his friends from high school, but they are immature and Ray feels increasingly alienated from them. Seeking connection, he begins a relationship with local teenager Toni Peck, whom he struggles to communicate with, both socially and during sexual activity, leading her to rebuff him.

Feeling isolated, Ray tells mother about his recent sexual encounter with Toni, and she offers him sexual advice. He later openly stares at his mother's body in the shower, increasing their physical intimacy. Just as things are escalating between them, Ray has an opportunity to leave his mother behind when his Aunt Helen offers to be Susan's caretaker. He excitedly prepares to leave the next day. Despite this, Ray and Susan have another sexual encounter after Helen annoys them both. This happens late at night and causes Ray to miss his bus the next day. Then Ray's father tells him he can no longer pay Ray's college tuition, worsening Ray's concern about his future.

Toni and Ray resume their sexual relationship and are kissing when Susan interrupts them. She slaps Toni, injuring her. Ray and Susan have a loud argument that quickly devolves into groping and kissing. Toni flees and is comforted by her father, who then confronts Ray; Susan flirts with Toni's father, distracting him from punishing Ray.

Ray attempts to hang himself from the bathroom door but Susan interrupts him. Frustrated, he complains that he can't achieve anything and attempts to initiate sex with her. He kisses her passionately, then pulls back and attempts to strangle her, then stops himself. He accepts an invitation from his friends to hang out with them again, joining them near the river. After being provoked by one of them, he jumps off a cliff. Early the next morning, Ray hitches a ride from a truck driver.

== Cast ==
- Jeremy Davies as Raymond "Ray" Aibelli
- Alberta Watson as Susan Aibelli
- Benjamin Hendrickson as Tom Aibelli
- Carla Gallo as Toni Peck
- Judette Jones as Aunt Helen
- Matthew Puckett as Nicky
- Zak Orth as Curtis
- Josh Philip Weinstein as Joel
- Judah Domke as Don
- Nancy Fields as Dr. Wilson

== Music ==
Select tracks from Morphine's album Cure for Pain are used throughout the film, including "In Spite of Me" which plays over the end credits.

== Reception ==
Spanking the Monkey was a box office success, grossing $1,359,736 on a $200,000 budget.

On Rotten Tomatoes, the film has an approval rating of 92% based on reviews from 26 critics and an average rating of 7.4/10. The site's consensus states: "David O. Russell's feature debut scores with an endearing cast and offbeat humor, finding compelling sweetness in perverse places." On Metacritic it has a score of 66% based on reviews from 15 critics.

The film won the Audience Award at the 1994 Sundance Film Festival and the Independent Spirit Award for Best First Screenplay.

=== Year-end lists ===
- 6th – Bob Strauss, Los Angeles Daily News
- 6th – Douglas Armstrong, The Milwaukee Journal
- 10th – Peter Travers, Rolling Stone
- 10th – Todd Anthony, Miami New Times
- Top 10 (listed alphabetically, not ranked) – Jimmy Fowler, Dallas Observer
- Top 10 runner-ups (not ranked) – Janet Maslin, The New York Times
- Honorable mention – Glenn Lovell, San Jose Mercury News
