= Francine (band) =

American indie rock band

- Francine live at T.T. the Bear's Place, December 2007

Background information
- Origin: Boston, Massachusetts, United States
- Genre: Indie rock
- Years active: 1997–present
- Label: Q Division
- Members: Clayton Scoble; Steve Scully; Sean Connelly; Albert Gualtieri; Ken Lafler
- Past members: Paul Simonoff; Jason Sakos

Francine is an indie rock band from Boston, Massachusetts, USA.

== History ==
Francine was founded by Clayton Scoble, who previously performed with Til Tuesday and Aimee Mann, and was a member of Poundcake and Colortone. He assembled the group towards the end of 1997 and soon after self-released a few solo demo tapes. The newly-formed band then released an EP and a full-length album on the Massachusetts indie label Q Division Records. A second album followed in 2003. The group received positive reviews, but did not tour nationally behind the album. In 2006, the group released a third album, entitled Airshow.

The Francine song, "Albany Brownout", was used by Fox network's series The O.C. in January, on episode 3.11, "The Safe Harbor".

Francine has appeared on various tribute recordings, including one to Kim Deal and one to the dBs.

== Discography ==
- Pop Warner EP (Q Division Records, 2000)
- Forty on a Fall Day (Q Division, 2000)
- 28 Plastic Blue Versions of Endings Without You (Q Division, 2003)
- Airshow (Q Division, 2006)
- When We Were Loud (self-released, 2018)
