= Gravel (surname) =

Gravel or Gravell is a surname. Notable people with the surname include:

- François Gravel (born 1951), Canadian writer
- François Gravel (ice hockey) (born 1968), Canadian hockey player
- John Gravel (born 1941), Canadian ice hockey player
- Karl Gravell, Canadian airman posthumously awarded the George Cross in 1941
- Kevin Gravel, (born 1992), American ice hockey player
- Mike Gravel (1930–2021), American politician; U.S. senator for Alaska
- Ray Gravell, Welsh rugby union player
- Raymond Gravel, Canadian Catholic priest and politician
- Robert Gravel, 20th-century Canadian actor and theatre figure
