= Vapors of Morphine =

American rock band

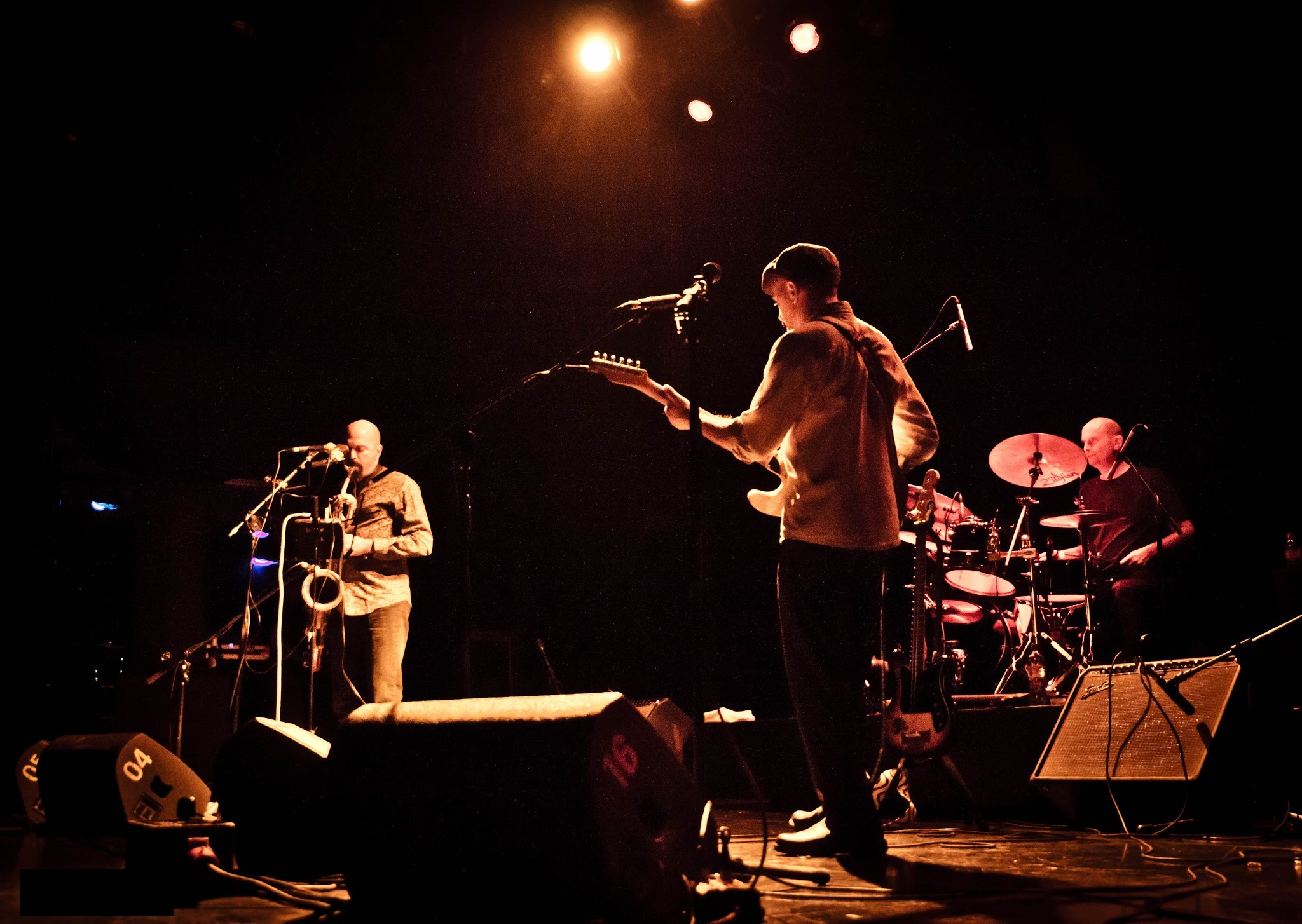
- Vapors of Morphine performing in Buenos Aires, Argentina in 2014

Background information
- Origin: Cambridge, Massachusetts, USA
- Genres: Alternative rock; blues rock
- Years active: 2009–present
- Members: Dana Colley; Tom Arey; Jeremy Lyons
- Past members: Jerome Deupree; Billy Conway; Jeff Allison
- Website: vaporsofmorphine.com

Vapors of Morphine is an American rock band founded in 2009 by the remaining members of the alternative rock band Morphine, saxophonist Dana Colley and drummer Jerome Deupree, along with blues guitarist Jeremy Lyons. Deupree stepped down in early 2019; Tom Arey (Peter Wolf, Ghosts of Jupiter) has taken his place.

== History ==
The band was officially formed in 2009, when Dana Colley was asked to bring a group to Nel Nome Del Rock Festival in Palestrina, Italy. Ten years earlier, Morphine's frontman Mark Sandman had suddenly died of a massive heart attack while performing in that venue.

After some deliberation, Colley invited Jeremy Lyons to sing and play the 2-string slide bass, along with drummer Jerome Deupree. Lyons asked friend "Washtub" Robbie Phillips to build a 2-string bass for him and started learning the Morphine repertoire. The process wasn't easy as Lyons had to master a new instrument while singing below his natural vocal range.

In the beginning, they couldn't agree on a name. They alternated between “Members of Morphine & Jeremy Lyons” and the “Elastic Waste Band,” which eventually morphed into “The Ever Expanding Elastic Waste Band”. Early in 2014, someone asked Lyons if he didn't “play with ... the ‘vapors’ of Morphine?”, inspiring the band's name as it is currently known.

Vapors of Morphine have toured through the United States, South America, Europe and Russia. Some highlights have been successful European and South American tours in 2017 and 2018; Mês Da Cultura Independente (São Paulo, Brazil, 2014), The New Orleans Jazz & Heritage Festival (USA, 2012); Virada Cultural Festival in Sao Paulo, Brazil (2012), New Orleans’ Voodoo Experience (USA, 2011); and Maquinaria Festival in Santiago, Chile (2011).

Former Morphine drummer Billy Conway played as a guest, filling in for Deupree or making the group a quartet. Studio drummer Jeff Allison filled in as drummer in 2012 when Deupree was suffering from tendonitis.

In June 2019, the band announced Deupree's amicable departure, and that drummer Tom Arey (J. Geils Band, Peter Wolf’s Midnight Ramblers, Ghosts of Jupiter) would be taking his place. Both Dupree and Arey appear on the band's 2021 release, Fear & Fantasy.

== Discography ==
- The Ever Expanding Elastic Waste Band (as Members of Morphine and Jeremy Lyons)
- A New Low (2016)
- Fear & Fantasy (2021)
