= The Downbeat 5 =

American rock band (founded 1999)

- Origin: Boston, Massachusetts
- Years active: 1999–present
- Labels: Sympathy for the Record Industry, Abbey Lounge/Hi-n-Dry, Steel Cage
- Members: Jen D'Angora : Vocals, rhythm guitar J. J. Rassler : Lead guitar, backing vocals Mike Yocco : Bass guitar, backing vocals Dan Styklunas : Drums
- Past members: Dan McCarthy : Drums; Jeff Norcross : Drums, backing vocals Brad San Martin : Bass guitar, backing vocals Eric Almquist: Drums

The Downbeat 5 (not to be confused with Tommy Pollard's Downbeat Five) is a Boston-based rock band started in 1999 by former DMZ guitarist J. J. Rassler and his then-wife, Jen, (who originally used the stage name Ronny Rassler). The band's music draws on 1960s girl group sounds, garage rock, and rougher-edged British Invasion bands like The Rolling Stones.

In 2003, the band made it as far as the semi-finals of the 25th annual WBCN Rock & Roll Rumble. The following year, they placed in the finals of Little Steven's Underground Garage battle of the bands, with Little Steven remaining a strong supporter afterwards.

In early 2003, D'Angora started a second band with Michelle Paulhus (ex-Decals) called The Dents. The Dents have more of a pop-punk sound than The Downbeat 5, with D'Angora and Paulhus sharing the songwriting and lead vocal duties.

The band's most recent album, Smoke and Mirrors (released in early 2007), was recorded live in front of an audience in a recording studio.

Although not as active in recent years, the DB5 still perform from time to time, usually in the Boston area.

== Discography ==
=== Albums ===
- 'Ism (2003, Sympathy for the Record Industry)
  - review: Allmusic link
- Victory Motel (2005, Abbey Lounge/Hi-n-Dry)
  - review: The Patriot Ledger (enthusiastic), July 21, 2005, p. 35
  - review: Razorcake (mixed) link
- Smoke and Mirrors (2007, Steel Cage)
  - review: Sleazegrinder.com (positive) link

=== Compilation appearances ===
- Gotham Garage (2002, Enoch) (song: "Cryin' in the Night")
- Return to the Scene of the Crime (2002, Good Cop/Bad Cop) (song: "I Got It Bad")
- Co-ed Rock n Roll Rumble 7-inch EP (2004, Carbon 14) (song: "Dum Dum Ditty")
- Crimson and Clover (2004, Wildebeest) (song: "Mirage")
