= Twinemen =

American alternative rock band

- Origin: Cambridge, Massachusetts, United States
- Genres: Acid rock, alternative rock, indie rock, jazz rock
- Years active: 2001–2008
- Labels: Hi-n-Dry, Kufala Recordings
- Members: Laurie Sargent; Dana Colley; Billy Conway

Twinemen were an alternative rock band based in Cambridge, Massachusetts, United States, created by former members of the bands Morphine and Face to Face. The group included Dana Colley (saxophone / vocals), Billy Conway (percussion / vocals / sometimes acoustic guitar), and Laurie Sargent (lead singer / lead guitar). Various bass players, including former Face to Face guitarist Stuart Kimball, also performed with the band on the road and in the studio. Twinemen's music included a mix of jazz, blues, acid rock, and lounge.

Twinemen chose their name as an homage to Morphine's late leader Mark Sandman and his The Twinemen comic series. The Twinemen depicted three anthropomorphic balls of twine who play together in a band. Twinemen formerly recorded in Mark Sandman’s former Cambridge-based Hi-n-Dry Studios.

== Discography ==
=== Studio albums ===
- Twinemen (July 9, 2002)
- Sideshow (September 21, 2004)
- Twinetime (August 21, 2007)

=== Live albums ===
All live albums released through the Kufala Recordings label.

- Madison, Wisconsin 02/01/2003
- Chicago, Illinois 02/02/2003
- Cambridge, Massachusetts 10/23/2003
- Denver, Colorado 09/25/2003
- San Francisco, California 10/01/2003
- Los Angeles, California 10/02/2003

=== Singles ===
- Spinner (2003) Released on CD through Cooking Vinyl
