= The Gravel Pit =

- Origin: New Haven, Connecticut, United States
- Genres: Alternative rock; Power pop
- Years active: 1985–present
- Label: Q Division
- Members: Jed Parish; Lucky Jackson; Ed Valauskas; Pete Caldes

The Gravel Pit is a rock band from Boston's underground music scene, formed in New Haven, and consisting of Jed Parish, Lucky Jackson, Ed Valauskas, and Pete Caldes.

== Biography ==
In 1995, Jed Parish, Lucky Jackson, Ed Valauskas and Pete Caldes came to Boston as The Gravel Pit—a young rock band from New Haven, CT, having a few years of high-energy club gigs and an indie debut (Crash Land, on Feralette Records) based on influences like the Clash and The Undertones. Gradually incorporating a range of influences from mod to metal the band generated a buzz on the Boston scene. Their early fans included such local pop stars as Kay Hanley and Jen Trynin, whose spirited support helped to bring the Pit to the attention of their Boston-based indie label, Q Division Records.

Within a year of their arrival in Boston, The Gravel Pit released the first of four Q Division releases. The Gravel Pit Manifesto (with pop-maestro producer Mike Denneen), was a brightly original, power-pop gem that earned them Best Indie Album and Best New Band at the 1996 Boston Music Awards. Over the next three years, they opened for acts such as Graham Parker, Cheap Trick, Gang of Four, Morphine, Guided By Voices, Nada Surf and They Might Be Giants and released three more records on Q,: 1997's full-length No One Here Gets In For Free—Rare and Unreleased 1989 - 1997; the 1998 hit single "Favorite," produced by Denneen; and 1999's full-length Silver Gorilla, also with Denneen, which amassed critical raves across the country, from Raygun to Entertainment Weekly. The Gravel Pit won the Boston Regional Poll at The 1st Annual Independent Music Awards.

After their national Silver Gorilla tour, without the break of a major label deal and commercial exposure, the band decided to tone down their live performance schedule and spread out their efforts for a while. Valauskas, Jackson and Caldes formed The Gentlemen, a hard-rock act, with Mike Gent of the Figgs. Parish has been exploring the terrain of his musical tastes as a solo artist.

Their separate explorations did not diminish their collective chemistry. With the release of 2001's Mass Avenue Freeze-out on Q Division, The Gravel Pit came together to stake another claim as one of the most inspired power-pop outfits on the American independent music scene.

The Gravel Pit contributed a cover of the Miracle Legion song "Closer to the Wall" for the 2009 Mark Mulcahy tribute album "Ciao My Shining Star". It appears as a bonus track available on the deluxe edition. On September 20, 2009 Jed Parish, Ed Valauskas & Pete Caldes performed at the release party for the album with Frank Black and Ray Neal on Black's contribution to the album, 'Bill Jocko', at the Music Hall of Williamsburg. Valauskas, Caldes & Neal remained on stage to perform two Pixies songs 'Cactus' and 'Gouge Away'.

The band released their first album in 13 years, Serpent Umbrella, in 2014.

== Members ==
- Jedediah "Jed" Parish: keys, vocals
- Ed Valauskas: bass
- Pete Caldes: drums
- Lucky Jackson: guitar

== Discography ==
- Crash Land (1994)
- The Gravel Pit Manifesto (1996)
- Silver Gorilla (1999)
- Mass Avenue Freeze Out (2001)
- Serpent Umbrella (2014)
