= The Night (Morphine album) =

Studio album by Morphine
- Released: February 1, 2000
- Recorded: 1998–1999
- Studios: Hi-N-Dry (Cambridge); Super Sonic (Cambridge); Magic Shop (New York City)
- Genre: Alternative rock
- Length: 50:09
- Label: DreamWorks
- Producers: Mark Sandman; Morphine

Morphine chronology
Like Swimming (1997)	The Night (2000)	Cocoon (2026)

The Night is the fifth studio album by the alternative rock band Morphine, released in 2000 via DreamWorks. The album expands the band's sound beyond their usual arrangements of previous albums (bass, saxophone and drums), introducing acoustic guitars, organs, strings and female backing vocals. It peaked at No. 137 on the Billboard 200.

== Production ==
Jerome Deupree, the band's original drummer, who had previously quit due to health problems, rejoined and played alongside Billy Conway, according to credits listed in the CD booklet. The Night was thus Morphine's first album recorded as a quartet rather than a trio.

The band recorded the album over two years in the Cambridge, Massachusetts, home studio of singer-bassist Mark Sandman.

The recording sessions were completed shortly before Sandman's sudden July 1999 death. Sandman and saxophonist Dana Colley oversaw the final mixing process.

== Critical reception ==
Professional ratings
Review scores
Source	Rating
AllMusic	3/5 stars
Robert Christgau	(choice cut)
Des Moines Register	4.5/5 stars
The Encyclopedia of Popular Music	4/5 stars
Los Angeles Times	3/4 stars
Orlando Sentinel	4.5/5 stars
Pitchfork Media	5.7/10
Rolling Stone	3.5/5 stars
Spin	8/10

The Pitch wrote that "it’s not a romantic exaggeration to say that this album is the trio’s most sensuous, satisfying recording, finally delivering on the diverting-but-two-dimensional original notion of what Sandman termed 'low rock' ... The Night is the first time in ages a posthumous release has made noise from beyond the grave that doesn’t sound like a cash register." Trouser Press wrote that "the tone may be dour due to the singer’s sudden death, but the music is the most fully realized and finely textured Morphine ever mustered." Exclaim! called the album "a slow, grinding burlesque that hovers tentatively between testifying to above and wallowing down below."

== Track listing ==
All songs written by Mark Sandman.

1. "The Night" – 4:50
2. "So Many Ways" – 4:01
3. "Souvenir" – 4:40
4. "Top Floor, Bottom Buzzer" – 5:44
5. "Like a Mirror" – 5:26
6. "A Good Woman Is Hard to Find" – 4:14
7. "Rope on Fire" – 5:36
8. "I'm Yours, You're Mine" – 3:46
9. "The Way We Met" – 2:59
10. "Slow Numbers" – 3:58
11. "Take Me with You" – 4:54

== Personnel ==
Adapted from the album liner notes.

Morphine

- Mark Sandman – vocals, 2-string slide bass, acoustic guitar, piano, organ, trombone, tritar
- Dana Colley – baritone saxophone, tenor saxophone, bass saxophone, piano, backing vocals,
- Billy Conway – drums, percussion, backing vocals

Additional musicians

- Jerome Deupree – drums (1–8, 10, 11)
- Jane Scarpantoni – cello (1, 7, 11)
- Mike Rivard – double bass (7, 11)
- John Medeski – organ (4, 8)
- Billy Beard – hand drum (7)
- Brahim Fribgane – oud, frame drum (7)
- Joseph Kessler – viola (7, 11)
- Carolyn Kaylor – backing vocals (2, 4)
- Linda Viens – backing vocals (2, 4)
- Ramona Clifton – backing vocals (4)
- Margaret Garrett – backing vocals (5)
- Tara McManus – backing vocals (5)

Technical

- Mark Sandman – producer, engineer (Hi-N-Dry)
- Morphine – producer, art direction
- Brian Dunton – engineer (Hi-N-Dry)
- Matthew Ellard – engineer (Hi-N-Dry)
- Juan Garcia – engineer (Magic Shop)
- Reto Peter – engineer (Magic Shop)
- Dave Kay – engineer (Super Sonic)
- Toby Mountain – mastering
- Robert Fisher – design

== Charts ==
Chart (2000)	Peak position
US Billboard 200	137
