= Lisa Olstein =

American poet (born 1972)

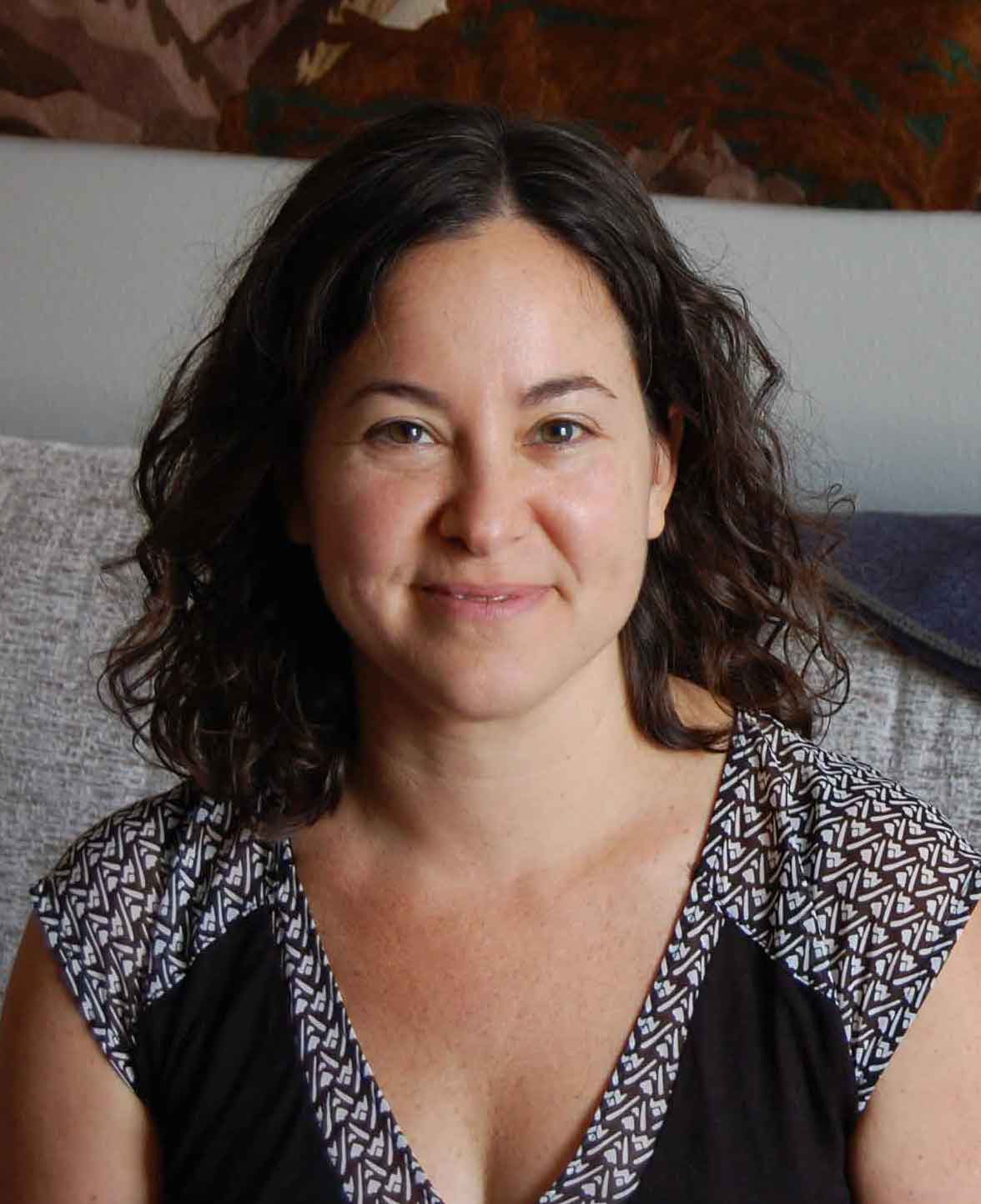
Lisa Olstein (2018)

Lisa Olstein (born 1972) is an American poet and non-fiction writer.

== Biography ==
Lisa Olstein was born in 1972. She grew up near Boston, Massachusetts. She received a BA from Barnard College (1996) and an MFA in creative writing from the University of Massachusetts Amherst. She undertook additional studies at Harvard Divinity School.

She is an author of four books. Her first book of poems, Radio Crackling, Radio Gone (Copper Canyon Press, 2006). She won the Hayden Carruth Award. Her second collection, Lost Alphabet (Copper Canyon Press, 2009) was named one of the best poetry books of the year by Library Journal. Shane McCrae selected her chapbook The Resemblance of the Enzymes of Grasses to Those of Whales Is a Family Resemblance for an Essay Press Chapbook Prize. Her most recent book of poetry, Late Empire (Copper Canyon Press, 2017) she explores the complexities - beautiful and brutal - of our present moment. Pain Studies, a book of creative non-fiction is forthcoming from Bellevue Literary Press in 2020.

Her poems have appeared in The Nation, Iowa Review, Denver Quarterly, LIT, and other journals.

Olstein has also worked with singer-songwriter Jeffrey Foucault in the band Cold Satellite.

Lisa Olstein currently teaches in the New Writers Project and the Michener Center for Writers at the University of Texas at Austin, and also directed the Juniper Initiative for literary arts in Amherst, Massachusetts.

== Awards and honors ==
She has been awarded a Guggenheim Fellowship, a Pushcart Prize, a Lannan Writing Residency, and poetry fellowships from the Massachusetts Cultural Council and the Sustainable Arts Foundation.

== Poetry ==
- Distinguished Office of Echoes (Copper Canyon Press, 2025) ISBN 978-1556597237
- Late Empire (Copper Canyon Press, 2017)
- The Resemblance of the Enzymes of Grasses to Those of Whales Is a Family Resemblance (Essay Press, 2016) https://www.essaypress.org/ep-72/
- Little Stranger (Copper Canyon Press, 2013)
- Lost Alphabet (Copper Canyon Press, 2009)
- Radio Crackling, Radio Gone (Copper Canyon Press, 2006)

== Non-fiction ==
- Pain Studies, Bellevue Literary Press, 2020
