= Jerome Deupree =

American drummer (born 1956)

- Jerome Deupree playing with Vapors of Morphine in Buenos Aires, Argentina (2014)

Background information
- Born: November 9, 1956 (age 69); Cincinnati, Ohio, United States
- Genres: Rock; jazz; blues rock; alternative rock
- Occupation: Musician
- Instrument: Drums
- Years active: 1972–present

Jerome Deupree (born November 9, 1956) is an American musician, best known as the original drummer in the alternative rock band Morphine.

== Early career ==
Deupree started playing drums at the age of six, with the help of his two older brothers. In the early 1970s he formed a band with his brother Jesse. After high school, he moved to Bloomington, Indiana, where he got to record for the first time. After a few years he again relocated to Santa Cruz, California, where he played with Humans, who toured with Squeeze and opened for Patti Smith and Iggy Pop.

In 1981 he moved to Boston, and has lived there since. His early Boston projects included stints in Sex Execs and Either/Orchestra.

== Morphine ==
In the late 1980s, songwriter Mark Sandman suggested that the two jam with saxophone player Dana Colley. As Morphine, the three composed material and performed throughout the East Coast, including shows in New York. They also recorded at Q Division Studios and The Outpost. In 1991 Deupree was forced to leave the project temporarily due to pain in his hand. Billy Conway took his place during that period.

He returned to the band in 1992 and played on the debut album Good. The band also toured through California. Although the project was successful, Deupree had personal differences with Sandman, and he decided to leave the band at the end of 1992.

Soon after that, Sandman called him and asked him to take part in a demo session that ended up being the band's second album, Cure for Pain.

In 1999 he made 15 appearances with Morphine, playing along with drummer Conway, shortly before Sandman died while performing in Italy in 1999, ending the band suddenly.

== Post-Morphine projects ==
After Sandman's death, Colley, Conway, and Deupree formed the band Orchestra Morphine to tour behind Morphine's posthumous final album, The Night. Orchestra Morphine remained sporadically active thereafter, reassembling occasionally to perform Morphine material.

Deupree played frequently with jazz guitarist Joe Morris, appearing on several recordings. He participated in a formative version of the band Beat Circus in 2002, and joined the Boston group Bourbon Princess for an extended time. He has also appeared as a session musician on records by Eric Hutchinson, Merrie Amsterburg, Jen Trynin, and James McMurtry.

In 2009, Colley and Deupree began playing with New Orleans musician Jeremy Lyons as Members of Morphine, later renamed Vapors of Morphine. This trio performs classic Morphine songs and new material. Jerome left Vapors of Morphine in 2019.

In 2023, Deupree collaborated with Dana Colley (saxophone, bass clarinet) and Adam Steinberg (guitar) on an improvisational three-piece project called Effects of the Sun.

== Discography ==
Morphine

- Good (1992)
- Cure for Pain (1993)
- The Night (2000)

Either/Orchestra

- Dial "E" (1987)
- Radium (1988)
- The Half-Life of Desire (1990)

Joe Morris

- Sweatshop (1990)
- Flip and Spike (1992)
- Antennae (1997)
- Racket Club (1998)
- A Cloud of Black Birds (1998)
- Mess Hall (2014)

Bourbon Princess

- Black Feather Wings (2003)
- Dark of Days (2005)
