= Q Division Records =

Independent record label

- Parent company: Q Division Studios
- Founded: 1995
- Genre: Indie rock
- Country of origin: United States
- Location: Somerville, Massachusetts
- Official website: http://www.qdivision.com/

Q Division Records is an independent record label located in Somerville, Massachusetts founded in 1995.

== Artists ==
- Merrie Amsterburg
- Flying Nuns
- Francine
- Gigolo Aunts
- Loveless
- Rachael Cantu
- Anne Heaton
- Eli "Paperboy" Reed & The True Loves
- The Gravel Pit
- The Right Ons

== See also ==
- List of record labels
