= Karl Gravell =

Recipient of the George Cross

- Born: 27 September 1922; Norrköping, Sweden
- Died: 10 November 1941 (aged 19); Calgary, Alberta, Canada
- Burial place: Mountain View Cemetery
- Military career
- Allegiance: Canada
- Branch: Royal Canadian Air Force
- Service years: 1941
- Rank: Leading Aircraftman
- Service number: R/97644
- Conflicts: Second World War
- Awards: George Cross

Karl Mander Gravell, GC (27 September 1922 – 10 November 1941) was a Swedish and Canadian leading aircraftman who was posthumously awarded the George Cross, the highest British Commonwealth award for bravery out of combat. The decoration was awarded for the heroism he showed following an aircraft accident on 10 November 1941 near Calgary, Alberta.

== Early life ==
Born in Sweden in 1922, Gravell moved to Canada with his family in 1937 and became a naturalized Canadian citizen in July of that year. The aspiring air gunner joined the Royal Canadian Air Force on 15 March 1941 from his adopted home town of Vancouver, British Columbia. After completing his depot training, he had been posted to No. 2 Wireless School in Calgary.

== Second World War ==
Gravell was on a training flight under the instruction of Flying Officer James Robinson in Menasco Moth 4833. The aircraft suffered mechanical failure and crashed in flames. Gravell managed to get clear but despite his serious injuries – he had lost an eye and was badly burned – he dove back into the inferno with his own clothes still on fire in an effort to rescue the pilot. He was pulled from the wreckage but later died from his grievous burns.

The following citation was published in The London Gazette on 11 June 1942:

In November, 1941, a training aircraft crashed and immediately burst into flames. Leading Aircraftman Gravell, who was under training as a wireless air gunner, managed to extricate himself from the wreckage and get clear. In spite of the intense shock caused by the loss of one eye and severe burns, suffered at the time of the crash, Leading Aircraftman Gravell's first and only thought was for the welfare of his pilot. The pilot was still in the aircraft and Gravell ignoring his own serious injuries and the fact that his clothes were ablaze attempted to get back to the flaming wreckage to pull him clear. He had barely reached the aircraft when he was dragged away and rolled on the ground to extinguish the flames which had, by this time, completely enveloped his clothing. Leading Aircraftman Gravell subsequently died from his burns. Had he not considered his pilot before his own safety and had he immediately proceeded to extinguish the flames on his own clothing, he would probably not have lost his life.

Gravell is buried in Mountain View Cemetery, Vancouver. A monument to the bravery of Gravell and the schoolteacher, Frances Walsh, who pulled him from the wreckage, stands near the site of the crash, on the north-east corner of the intersection of Range Road 25A and Big Hill Springs Road west of Airdrie. Walsh was awarded the George Medal for her heroism.

Flying Officer Robinson was buried in the cemetery at Jasper, Alberta.
