= Merrie Amsterburg =

American singer-songwriter

Merrie Ruth Amsterburg (born in March 1960) is an American singer-songwriter born in Ludington, Michigan, United States. Her music has folk, rock, and pop influences. She has won two Boston Music Awards, a Boston Phoenix Award, and a Jam Magazine Award. She uses several instruments in her songs, including the guitar, the trumpet, the mandolin, the Indian banjo, the bouzouki, the harmonium, and even a 1970s Kenmore washing machine. Prior to her solo career, she was the guitarist and singer for The Natives and Miss Understood.

On July 5, 2002, she sang the National Anthem at the Red Sox's first game after the death of Red Sox and baseball legend Ted Williams, who had died that morning.

== Discography ==
- Season of Rain (1996)
- World of Our Own Making (1999) (EP)
- Season of Rain reissue (1999)
- Little Steps (2000)
- Clementine and Other Stories (2006)
