= Morphine (band) =

American alternative rock band (1989–1999)

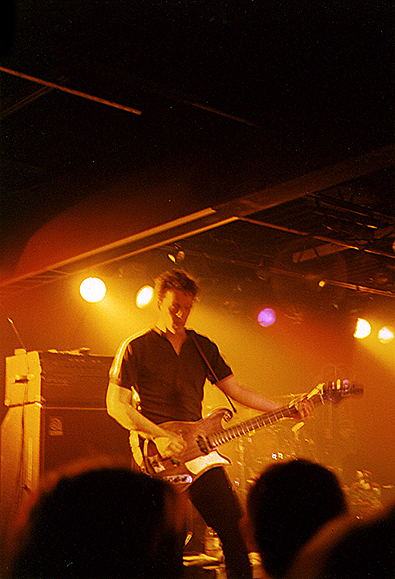
- Morphine in 1997 at Mississippi Nights, St Louis, MO

Background information
- Origin: Cambridge, Massachusetts, United States
- Genres: Alternative rock; blues rock; jazz rock
- Years active: 1989–1999
- Labels: Rykodisc; DreamWorks
- Spinoffs: Twinemen, Orchestra Morphine, Bourbon Princess, Vapors of Morphine
- Spinoff of: Treat Her Right
- Past members: Mark Sandman; Dana Colley; Jerome Deupree; Billy Conway
- Website: morphineband.com

Morphine were an American rock band formed by Mark Sandman, Dana Colley, and Jerome Deupree in Cambridge, Massachusetts, in 1989. Drummer Billy Conway replaced Deupree as the band's live drummer in 1991. After five successful albums and extensive touring, they disbanded after lead vocalist Sandman died of a heart attack onstage in Palestrina, Italy, on July 3, 1999 at the Nel Nome Del Rock Festival. Founding members have reformed into the band Vapors of Morphine, maintaining much of the original style and sound.

The band used an idiosyncratic set of instruments and combined blues and jazz elements with more traditional rock arrangements. Sandman sang distinctively in a "deep, laid-back croon", and his songwriting featured a prominent beat influence. The band themselves coined the label "low rock" to describe their music, which involved "a minimalist, low-end sound that could have easily become a gimmick: a 'power trio' not built around the sound of an electric guitar. Instead, Morphine expanded its offbeat vocabulary on each album."

The band enjoyed positive critical reviews, but had mixed results commercially. In the United States, the band was embraced and promoted by the indie rock community, including public and college radio stations and MTV's 120 Minutes, which the band once guest-hosted, but received little support from commercial rock radio and other music television programs.

== History ==
=== Formation, independent years (1989–1996) ===
Morphine was formed in 1989 by bassist and vocalist Mark Sandman, a member of the bluesy alternative rock band Treat Her Right, saxophonist Dana Colley, a former member of the local Boston group Three Colors, and drummer Jerome Deupree, who had played with Sandman in the Hypnosonics. Sandman, a prolific musician who frequently experimented with home-made instruments, played a single-stringed bass guitar of his own devising with a slide, although he later added a second string. Deupree briefly left the group for health reasons in 1991 and was temporarily replaced by Treat Her Right drummer Billy Conway. These years found the group building a strong local audience and touring occasionally.

With Deupree returning, they recorded their debut album, Good, for the Boston-based Accurate/Distortion label in 1991. The album received positive reviews and increased the band's audience. The band subsequently signed to Rykodisc, who re-released Good under its own imprint.

Cure for Pain, 1993's followup, increased the band's audience outside of New England, and singles like "Thursday" and "Buena" picked up some college radio play. During the recording of Cure for Pain, Deupree was again replaced by Conway, although Deupree still played most of the percussion work on the album. After the album was completed, the band toured the United States, Europe, Japan and Australia.

In 1994, five songs from the album were prominently featured on the soundtrack of the film Spanking the Monkey. The band returned to the studio in 1995 and produced Yes. The album featured the single "Honey White," the music video for which appeared on the MTV animated series Beavis and Butt-head, as had "Thursday". It also included "I Had My Chance," which was featured on the soundtrack for the film Get Shorty.

=== DreamWorks Records years (1997–1999) ===
After two years of touring, Morphine signed with DreamWorks Records, who released their major label debut, Like Swimming, in 1997. It was a critical success, but did not break the band into the domestic mainstream as had been hoped. DreamWorks released a music video for the single "Early to Bed"; directed by Jamie Caliri and released in March 1997, the nightmarish yet humorous video became an instant favorite among fans and was later nominated for a Grammy Award. The band also released B-Sides and Otherwise, a collection of B-sides and live recordings, on Rykodisc this same year.

In the following time, Deupree once again began performing live and in the studio with the band, making the group a four-piece. The band's final studio album, The Night, was completed in early 1999.

On July 3, 1999, Sandman collapsed on the stage of the Nel Nome del Rock festival at the Giardini del Principe in Palestrina, Italy, outside of Rome. He was soon pronounced dead of a heart attack and Morphine immediately disbanded. The Night was released in 2000. Posthumous Morphine releases followed shortly thereafter, including Bootleg Detroit, an "official live bootleg", and The Best of Morphine: 1992–1995, both on Rykodisc.

=== Posthumous projects (1999–present) ===
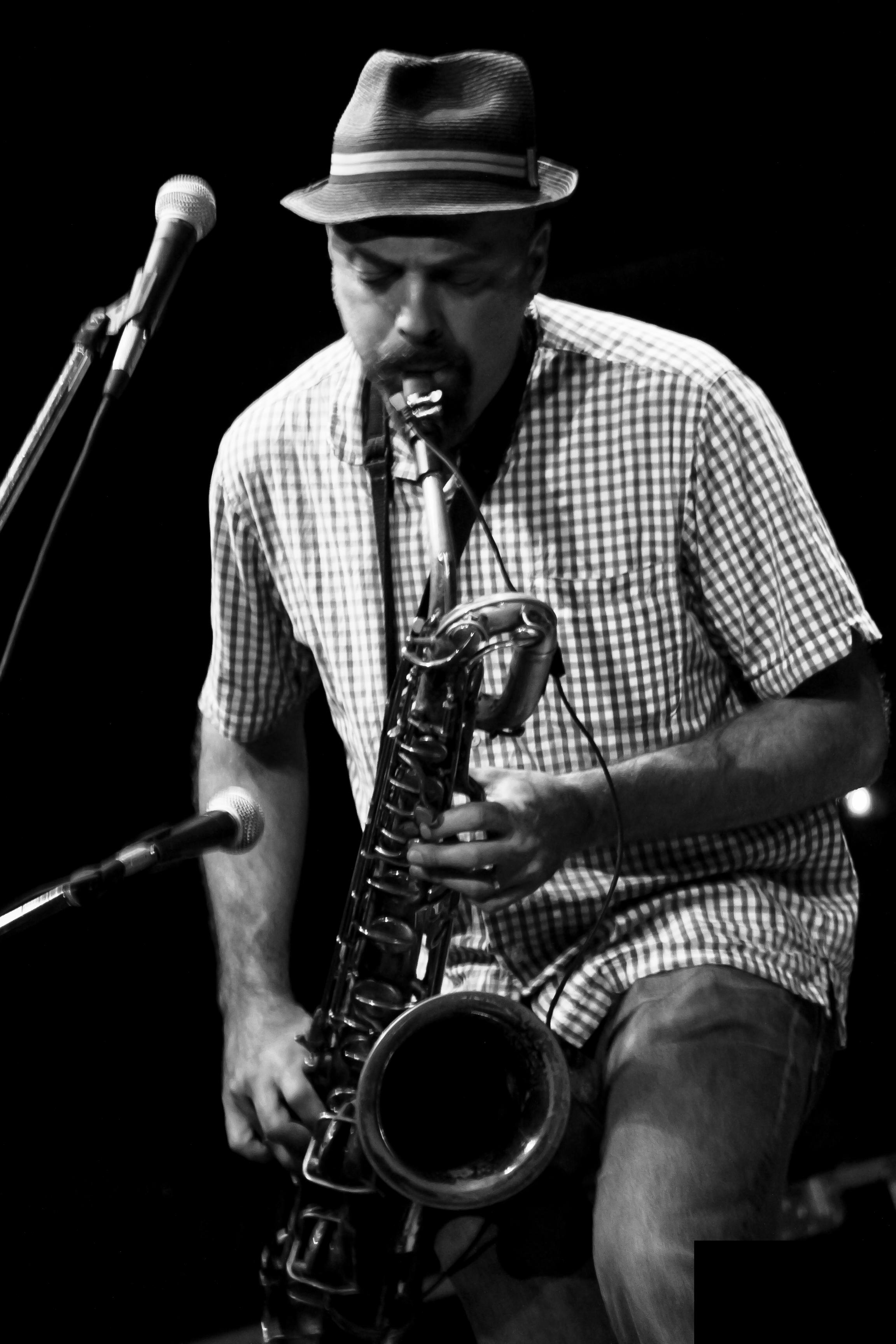
Dana Colley performing with the posthumous Members of Morphine project in 2011

Within a year of Sandman's death, Colley and Conway created Orchestra Morphine, a group of Sandman's friends and colleagues who toured to celebrate the music of the band and to raise funds for the Mark Sandman Music Education Fund. Orchestra Morphine mostly performed music from The Night, but also included some other Morphine and Hypnosonics material as well. Orchestra Morphine still performs occasionally but no longer tours. Singer and guitarist Laurie Sargent, a member of Orchestra Morphine and former vocalist for the band Face to Face, later joined Colley and Conway in their first post-Morphine musical endeavor, Twinemen.

Conway and Colley also officially formed the Hi-n-Dry independent record label and studio, converting Sandman's workspace into a commercial enterprise. The label's roster includes a number of their friends, colleagues and other Boston-area musicians. In 2004, Hi-n-Dry released the Mark Sandman box set Sandbox, which contained two CDs and a DVD of previously unreleased material spanning Sandman's musical career. The DVD featured clips from early Sandman shows, interviews from the Morphine tours, and various videos from other Sandman solo and group projects, such as Treat Her Right. However, for copyright reasons the box set did not contain any previously released material found in the Morphine catalog, Morphine videos, or promotional material produced by Rykodisc or DreamWorks Records.

Deupree continued to record with various jazz musicians.

In 2009, Colley and Deupree began regularly performing Morphine songs and new material as Members of Morphine (alternately, the Ever-Expanding Elastic Waste Band), with singer, bassist and guitarist Jeremy Lyons of New Orleans. In July 2009, the group played at Nel Nome Del Rock Festival in Palestrina, Italy, marking the ten-year anniversary of Sandman's death at the location in which it occurred. As of 2014, the group was renamed Vapors of Morphine and regularly perform in Boston and New Orleans. They held a standing weekly gig at Atwood's Tavern in Cambridge, Massachusetts, until its closure after 16 years in March 2023.

In 2009, Rhino Records released the two-disc set At Your Service, composed of unreleased Morphine material.

As of 1999, Morphine has sold over 807,000 records in the United States, according to Nielsen SoundScan.

On December 19, 2021, drummer Billy Conway died from liver cancer, aged 65.

On what would be Sandman's 74th birthday, September 24, 2026 the band announced a new album Cocoon slated for release on December 4 of the same year. It was self described as a "lost album". The title track, "Cocoon," released on YouTube the same day.

== Band members ==
- Mark Sandman – vocals, bass guitar, organ, guitars, piano (1989–1999; died 1999)
- Dana Colley – saxophone, triangle, backing vocals (1989–1999)
- Jerome Deupree – drums, percussion (1989–1991, 1991–1993, 1998–1999)
- Billy Conway – drums, percussion (1991, 1993–1999; died 2021)

== Instruments ==
Morphine's instrumentation was unusual for a rock band: Sandman's primary instrument was a two-string bass guitar (with the strings usually tuned to a 5th or octave interval) played with a slide; however, on the group's records he added touches of guitar, piano, electronic organ, and other self-invented guitar instruments such as the tritar, featuring two guitar strings and one bass string. Colley played primarily baritone saxophone, along with soprano or tenor saxes, and the rare bass saxophone, and he sometimes played two saxes at once, a la Roland Kirk; he also played occasional percussion, and Dobro on a B-side.

== Discography ==
Studio albums

- Good (1992)
- Cure for Pain (1993)
- Yes (1995)
- Like Swimming (1997)
- The Night (2000)
- Cocoon (2026)

Live albums

- Bootleg Detroit (2000)
- Live at the Warfield 1997 (2017)

Compilations

- B-Sides and Otherwise (1997)
- The Best of Morphine: 1992-1995 (2003)
- Sandbox: The Music of Mark Sandman (2004)
- At Your Service (2009)

Singles

- "Cure for Pain" (1993)
- "Buena" (1993)
- "Sexy X-Mas Baby Mine" (1993) (released as a vinyl-only single on the Singles Only Label)
- "Thursday" (1994)
- "Super Sex" (1995)
- "Honey White" (1995) Alternative #44
- "Early to Bed" (1997) Alternative #36
- "Murder for the Money" (1997) (France)
- "Potion" (1997) (Australia / New Zealand)
- "Eleven O'Clock" (1997) (Japan)
- "Cocoon" (2026)
