= Laurie Sargent =

American singer-songwriter

Laurie Sargent is best known as a songwriter and vocalist in the 1980s and 1990s. She was active in the city of Boston. Around 2008, she and her long-term partner, drummer Billy Conway, moved to Montana, where they began raising food on an organic farm. Sargent occasionally visits various cities to perform.

== Collaborations ==
- Jim Steinman
- Holly Sherwood
- Mark Sandman

== Bands ==
- Fire, Inc., a group performing some of the soundtrack of the 1984 movie Streets of Fire
  - Nowhere Fast
- Face to Face, a new wave band from Boston
- Twinemen
