= Mark Sandman =

American musician, lead singer for band Morphine (1952-1999)

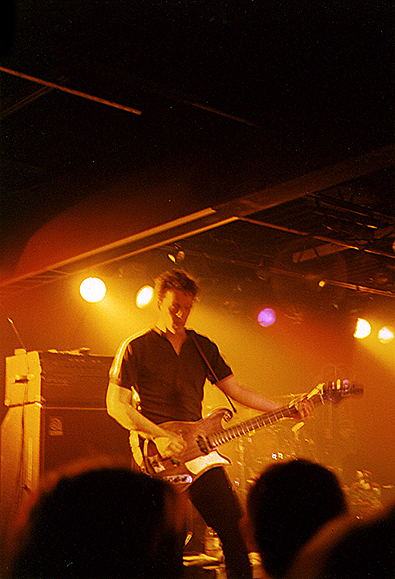
- Morphine at Mississippi Nights in St. Louis, 1997

Background information
- Born: September 24, 1952; Newton, Massachusetts, U.S.
- Died: July 3, 1999 (aged 46) Palestrina, Italy
- Genres: Alternative rock; blues rock; indie rock; jazz rock; experimental rock
- Occupations: Singer, songwriter, multi-instrumentalist, producer
- Instruments: Bass guitar; vocals; guitar; keyboards; piano
- Labels: Rykodisc, DreamWorks, Hi-n-Dry
- Formerly of: Morphine, Treat Her Right, The Hypnosonics

Mark Sandman (September 24, 1952 – July 3, 1999) was an American singer, songwriter, musical instrument inventor, multi-instrumentalist and comic writer. He was a longtime fixture in the Boston/Cambridge music scene, best known as the lead singer and slide bass player of the band Morphine. He was known for his distinctive, deep bass-baritone voice. Sandman was also a member of the blues-rock band Treat Her Right and founder of Hi-n-Dry, a recording studio and independent record label.

On July 3, 1999, Sandman died after suffering a heart attack during a concert in Italy.

He was highly regarded by many other bass players for his unique "slow and murky" style, with Les Claypool, Mike Watt and Josh Homme all citing Sandman as an influence.

== Early life ==
Mark Sandman was born into a Jewish American family in Newton, Massachusetts. He graduated from the University of Massachusetts with a B.A. in political science, then worked a variety of blue-collar jobs, including construction, taxi driving, and commercial fishing. Sandman once noted he would often earn considerable overtime pay, which allowed him to take leave of work and travel outside of New England to places such as rural Colorado—the setting for a number of Treat Her Right and Morphine songs penned by Sandman, including "Thursday," "The Jury" and "I Think She Likes Me."

Two tragic events affected Sandman's life and would later influence his music: he was robbed and stabbed in the chest during a robbery in his cab, and his two brothers died. These events would later be recounted in the Treat Her Right song "No Reason." His mother, Guitelle Sandman, later self-published Four Minus Three: A Mother's Story, a book about the loss of her three sons.

Few details are publicly known about Sandman's personal life. Fans have often speculated that many of Sandman's songs were autobiographical, which to this day remains unconfirmed. Although Sandman served as an unofficial spokesman for Morphine, he avoided answering questions about his personal life or his professional experiences outside of the music business. Sandman was reported to have been particularly secretive about his age, becoming angry with any reporter who expressed an interest in revealing it publicly, perhaps because he was 10 to 20 years older than most of his indie-rock contemporaries.

== Musical career ==
Along with Morphine, which he formed in 1989, Sandman was a member of the bands Treat Her Right, Sandman, Candy Bar, the Hypnosonics, Treat Her Orange, Supergroup (with Chris Ballew) and the Pale Brothers. He performed as a guest with the Boston jazz band Either/Orchestra.

His instruments were extensively altered and sometimes built by hand. In Morphine, he usually played a two-string slide bass guitar tuned to a fifth, and sometimes a unitar (named after the one-stringed instrument in American blues tradition), and three-string slide bass with one bass and two unison strings tuned an octave higher (usually to A). He sometimes paired bass strings with one or two guitar strings, creating the "basitar" "tri-tar" and "guitbass." The guitbass and basitar were later used by the band The Presidents of The United States of America, with whom Sandman was close friends.

For Sandman, the result was a murky, slurring sound that, particularly when paired with the baritone saxophone of Morphine's Dana Colley, created what Sandman termed "low rock." His baritone singing completed the sound. "We're just baritone people," he once told an interviewer. "And the cumulative effect of all these instruments is that it sounds really low, but you can still hear what's going on between the different instruments. It hits the body in a peculiar way that some people like a lot."

As a lyricist, Sandman was influenced by pulp fiction writer Jim Thompson, crime writer James Ellroy, and Beat poet/novelist Jack Kerouac.

During Morphine's active years, the band released five albums and one B-sides compilation. They toured extensively, both domestically and internationally, and became the second act signed to DreamWorks Records. During the 1990s, Sandman continued to expand his Cambridge-based home recording studio with second-hand instruments and equipment, calling the studio Hi-n-Dry. Hi-n-Dry became Morphine's unofficial home and they recorded many of their signature tracks using Sandman's unique homegrown production methods.

== The Twinemen ==
In addition to his work as a musician, Sandman was also an amateur photographer and artist. He created a comic titled The Twinemen, starring three anthropomorphic balls of twine who form a band, become successful, break up, and later reunite.

The Twinemen comic also showcased Sandman's signature technique of combining a simple pen or pencil drawing with watercolor paints. Sandman's art and photographs were showcased on the official Morphine website and later featured in a DVD released with the Sandbox box set.

Colley, Treat Her Right and Morphine drummer Billy Conway, and singer Laurie Sargent would later adopt the Twinemen moniker for their own band as an homage to Sandman.

== Death ==
Sandman collapsed on stage on July 3, 1999, at the Giardini del Principe in Palestrina, Lazio, Italy while performing with Morphine. He was taken to the hospital but died en route at the age of 46. His death, the result of a heart attack, has been attributed to heavy stress and a temperature of over 99 °F (37 °C) on the night of his death. Morphine disbanded following his death, although the surviving members briefly toured with other musicians as Orchestra Morphine, a tribute to Sandman and in support of the posthumous release, The Night.

Following Sandman's death, Hi-n-Dry became a commercial record label and studio, dedicated to recording and releasing work by Boston-area artists. The label and studio is managed by Sandman's former Morphine bandmate Dana Colley and, until his death in 2021, Billy Conway. Hi-n-Dry issued a retrospective box set of Sandman's music called Sandbox in 2004. Another four disc Morphine box set has been compiled but has not been released due to the sale of former Morphine label, Rykodisc, to Warner Brothers.

In 2009, Colley, Deupree, and Boston musician Jeremy Lyons formed the group Vapors of Morphine. The band regularly performs in Boston and New Orleans.

=== Memorials and tributes ===
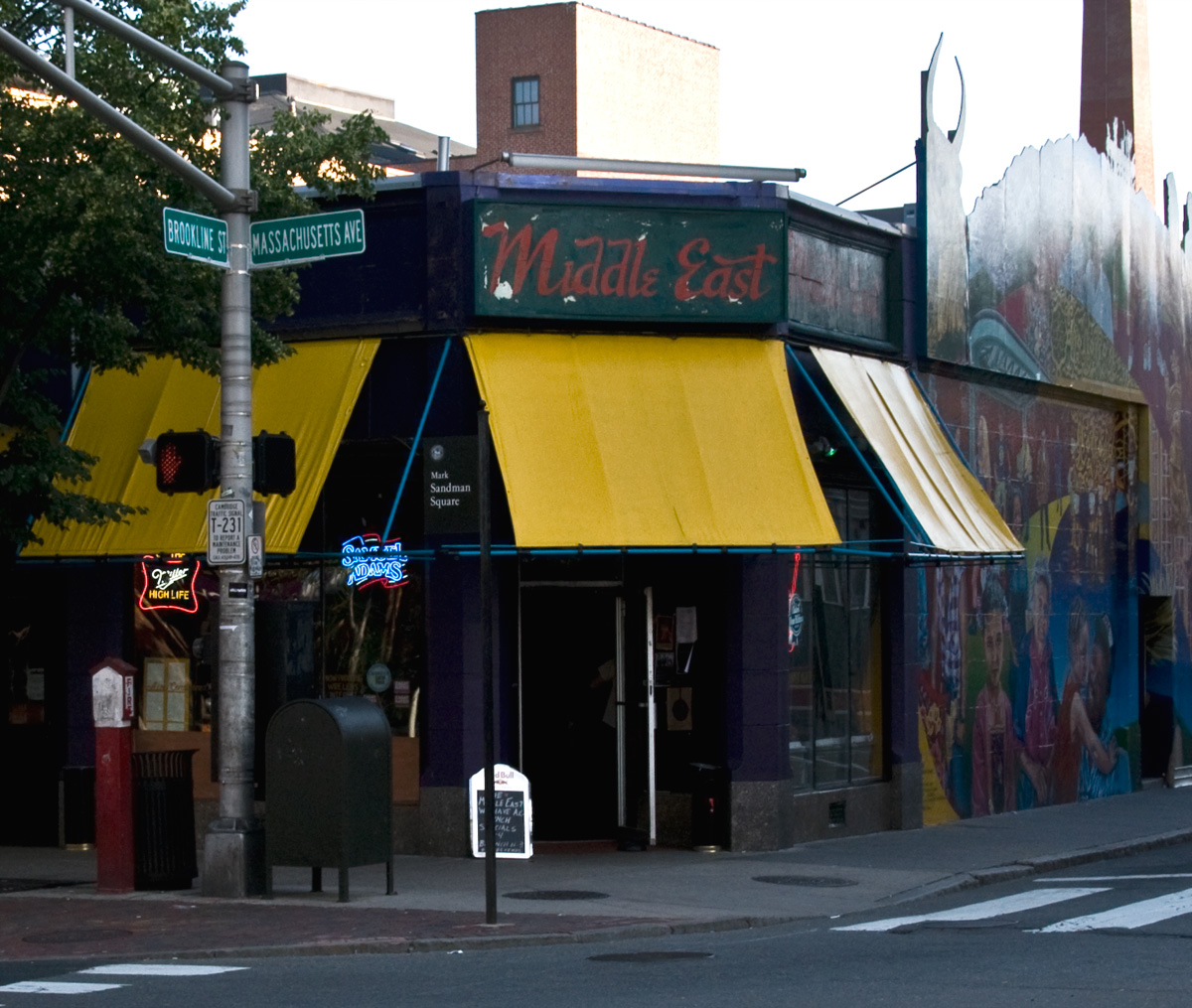
Mark Sandman Square in Cambridge, Massachusetts (2008)

- The intersection of Massachusetts Avenue and Brookline Street in Cambridge, Massachusetts' Central Square is named in Sandman's honor. This square is right outside the Middle East, a music club/restaurant frequented by Sandman.
- The Mark Sandman Music Education Fund was established by his friends and family in order to give children in the Cambridge and Boston area an opportunity to learn musical instruments. As of 2008, this foundation has been renamed the Mark Sandman Music Project. Housed in the newly renovated Armory Arts Center at 191 Highland Ave. Somerville, the Project hopes to continue Mark's legacy. The Project is a community based, not-for-profit organization dedicated to bringing children and music together to foster educational, recreational and artistic goals and experiences. The Hi-n-Dry community will be the driving force behind this project which believes in that creative collaboration creates community.
- Following Sandman's death, Chris Ballew, Dana Colley, and Billy Conway recorded and released a tribute song titled "Gone Again Gone." It was available online as an MP3 file for a limited time and a version of the song is on Chris Ballew's second solo album, The Days are Filled With Years.
- As a fellow bassist who admired Sandman, Les Claypool had an audience chant some "Yo Ho's" in honor of him at a show with Colonel Les Claypool's Fearless Flying Frog Brigade, which can be seen on his DVD 5 Gallons Of Diesel. Claypool also has a Sandman sticker on his bullet microphone.
- La Scalinata Mark J. Sandman, Giardini Del Principe, Palestrina, Italy - is a staircase named in his honor. There is a stone tablet with his name at the first stair-step of the stairway leading to where his last concert took place.
- Mirror with plaque, Cambridge Music, Cambridge.
- Tom Barman, a friend of Sandman and frontman of the Belgian band dEUS whom with Dana Colley collaborated on their second studio album In a Bar, Under the Sea, dedicated "The Real Sugar" to Sandman. The song is to be found on the band's 2005 effort Pocket Revolution.
- An American band, Brazzaville, recorded a tribute song titled "Sandman," which is available on their second album Somnambulista.
- The band Collective Soul, in memorial of Mark Sandman, covered Morphine's "You Speak My Language" on their Blender CD.
- Canadian band The Watchmen dedicated a live radio performance of their song "Any Day Now" to Sandman on Australia's Triple J network. The band had heard about his death while listening to news radio in an elevator on their way to the interview.
- In 2004, a copper wire sculpture of "The Twinemen" was created and gifted to the band by a fan named Tom Whitman. The sculpture, showing minor damage, was featured in the music video "Saturday," published on their Sideshow CD (September 21, 2004). In 2007, public interest led to a second wire sculpture which was auctioned off, the proceeds benefiting The Mark Sandman Music Project.
- Two of Morphine's songs, "Honey White" and "Super Sex," were featured in the Italian movie Viaggi di nozze. The director and actor Carlo Verdone is a fan of the band.
- A documentary Cure for Pain: The Mark Sandman Story came out in 2011.

== Quotes ==
- "The word 'Morphine' comes from the word 'Morpheus,' who is the god of dreams, and that kind appealed to us as a concept...I've heard there's a drug called 'morphine' but that's not where we're coming from...we were dreaming, Morpheus comes into our dreams...and we woke up and started this band...we're all wrapped up in these dream messages, and we were compelled to start this band."

== Discography ==
=== Albums with Treat Her Right ===
- Treat Her Right (1986)
- Tied to the Tracks (1989)
- What's Good for You (1991)
- The Lost Album (2009)

=== Albums with Morphine ===
- Good - 1992
- Cure for Pain - 1993
- Yes - 1995
- Like Swimming - 1997
- The Night - 2000

=== Solo ===
- Sandbox: The Music of Mark Sandman - 2004
- Cure For Pain : The Mark Sandman Story Bonus CD - 2012

=== Guest appearances ===
With Either/Orchestra

- The Half-Life of Desire (Accurate, 1990)

With The Presidents Of The United States Of America

- II (The Presidents of the United States of America album) (Columbia, 1996)

With Tanya Donelly

- Beautysleep (2002)
