= Q Division Studios =

American recording studio

Coordinates: 42°23′41.86″N 71°7′3.54″W

- Type: Recording studio
- Industry: Music recording
- Founded: 1986; 40 years ago
- Headquarters: Cambridge, Massachusetts, United States
- Website: www.qdivisionstudios.com

Q Division Studios is a recording studio in Cambridge, Massachusetts. Founded in 1986, the studio has recorded albums by Pixies, James Taylor, Aimee Mann, Morphine, and Fountains of Wayne, among others.

== History ==
Q Division opened in 1986 at 443 Albany Street in Boston. The studio relocated in 2000 to a two-room facility on Highland Avenue in Davis Square, Somerville, then moved to its current location at 171 Rindge Avenue in Cambridge in 2023.

== Notable recordings ==
The studio's most recognized project is Pixies' debut album Surfer Rosa, recorded there in 1987.

Other artists who have recorded at Q Division include James Taylor, Aimee Mann, Jerry Douglas, Buffalo Tom, Gigolo Aunts, Mighty Mighty Bosstones, Dropkick Murphys, Jon Brion, Merrie Amsterburg, Yo-Yo Ma, The Click Five, Al Kooper, Morphine, Graham Parker, Fountains of Wayne, State Radio, Mission of Burma, Converge and Abandoned Pools.

== Staff ==
Recording engineers who have worked at Q Division include Mike Denneen, Jon Lupfer, Rich Costey, Steve Albini, Kris Smith, Shane O'Connor, Sean Slade, and Paul Kolderie.
