= Hi-n-Dry =

Record label and recording studio in Cambridge, MA

Hi-N-Dry was a Cambridge, Massachusetts, USA-based independent record label and recording studio. Founded by Morphine singer and bassist Mark Sandman, the studio and label became managed by former Morphine bandmates Dana Colley and Billy Conway along with Laurie Sargent and Andrew Mazzone (now deceased). Once located in Sandman's former loft apartment (now Industry Lab in Cambridge), the studio moved to the Center for the Arts at the Armory in Somerville, Massachusetts in December 2007. In 2008, Hi-N-Dry started the "Mark Sandman Music Project", whereby local musicians and volunteers work with children to help teach them, and develop their interest in, music. The label folded some time before the move to the Armory. A few years after the move, Hi-N-Dry was officially ended and the studio and lease were handed over to others to run for several years as "Armory Sound," still retaining some of the original Hi-N-Dry equipment.

== Notable artists ==
- Twinemen
- Rick Berlin
- Caged Heat
- The Downbeat 5
- The Family Jewels
- Jimmy Ryan (mandolinist, also of Blood Oranges)
- Maybe Baby
- Scissormen
- Session Americana
- Three Day Threshold

== See also ==
- Lists of record labels
