= Dana Colley =

American saxophonist

- Dana Colley performing with Vapors of Morphine in Buenos Aires, Argentina (2014)

Background information
- Genres: Alternative rock; blues rock; indie rock; post-punk
- Occupations: Musician, songwriter, producer
- Instruments: Saxophone; harmonica; triangle
- Years active: 1985–present
- Labels: Rykodisc, DreamWorks Records, Hi-n-Dry

Dana Colley is an American musician, best known as the baritone and tenor saxophonist in the alternative rock band Morphine.

== Early life ==
Colley was born in Portland, Maine, but he was raised in Hanson, Massachusetts, where he took up the clarinet in the 4th grade, switching to tenor sax in 7th. He picked up the baritone sax in 1984.

== Musical career ==
=== With Three Colors (1985–1988) ===
Colley originally appeared in the Boston, Massachusetts indie rock scene playing with the group Three Colors, a post-punk band formed in 1981 whom he joined in 1985. While Colley established himself as primarily a saxophonist, he also played harmonica with the group. After modest success behind several small-run records and a brief relocation to Princeton, New Jersey, the group disbanded in late 1988.

=== Morphine (1989–1999) ===
In 1989, Colley co-founded Morphine with front-man Mark Sandman of Boston-based Treat Her Right. The two were joined by drummer Jerome Deupree and quickly garnered a local following. Their debut album, 1992's Good, was picked up by the Rykodisc label in 1993, and the band embarked on extensive, successful touring. Colley's main instrument with the band was baritone sax, but he occasionally sang backing vocals, played percussion or other saxes (tenor, bass or soprano).

Shortly thereafter, Treat Her Right drummer Billy Conway replaced Deupree, who was suffering from health problems. Following two more albums with Rykodisc, the band signed with the major label DreamWorks Records in 1996. They scored a minor MTV hit with "Early to Bed" from 1997's Like Swimming, and continued to enjoy local and international success, particularly in Europe. In 1999, Sandman died unexpectedly of a heart attack while onstage in Italy, bringing the band to an abrupt end.

=== Post-Morphine projects (1999–present) ===
Following Sandman's death, Colley, Conway and Deupree assembled a nine-piece band they dubbed Orchestra Morphine to tour behind their posthumous final album, The Night. Orchestra Morphine remained sporadically active thereafter, reassembling occasionally to perform Morphine material.

Musical chemistry between Colley, Conway, and Orchestra Morphine member Laurie Sargent (a Boston mainstay and former member of Face to Face) led the trio to start their own group, Twinemen, a name they took from a comic drawn by Sandman. Formed in 2001, Twinemen have since released three full-length studio albums and toured extensively. Continuing a tradition he had begun in Morphine, Colley provided woodblock print artwork for the band's records. Colley, Conway and Sargent were also instrumental in re-opening the Hi-n-Dry studio and record label, Sandman's former workspace and imprint.

In 2004 Colley produced and performed on "Black Feather Wings", the second release from Bourbon Princess. 2006, Colley co-founded A.K.A.C.O.D. with bassist/songwriter Monique Ortiz of Bourbon Princess and drummer Larry Dersch. The band released their debut Happiness album in 2007.

Occasionally since about 2007, Colley has been a guest with several Boston-area bands, prominently the instrumental groups Dub Apocalypse and Club d'Elf as well as the punk rock and rockabilly band The Kings of Nuthin'.

Colley and Deupree began playing with New Orleans transplant Jeremy Lyons as Members of Morphine in 2009. This trio performs classic Morphine songs alongside of new material, and played the ten-year anniversary of Sandman's death at the festival at which it occurred, the Nel Nome Del Rock Festival in Palestrina, Italy, on July 3, 2009. As of 2014, the trio renamed themselves Vapors of Morphine and regularly performs shows in Boston and New Orleans.

Colley has also made guest appearances with Primus (on live versions of the song "Those Damned Blue-Collar Tweekers"), and Lilium, a project from Pascal Humbert of 16 Horsepower and Woven Hand. He also played saxophone and bass clarinet on Dan Brenner's 2011 CD Little Dark Angel, produced by Jay Newland. In 2012 he played in Italy with the Italian band Rudy and the M.O.B. made by the Italian singer Rudy Marra.

In 2013 he joined a 3-piece named The Deltahorse, releasing an EP despite never having been in the same place at the same time as the bandmembers. They released their first full-length album, "Transatlantic" in September 2016.

Colley contributed to the album Stewing released in 2015 by The Grownup Noise.
