= Billy Conway (drummer) =

American drummer (1956–2021)

Background information
- Born: December 18, 1956; Owatonna, Minnesota, U.S.
- Died: December 19, 2021 (aged 65)
- Instrument: Drums
- Formerly of: Treat Her Right and Morphine

Billy Conway (December 18, 1956 – December 19, 2021) was an American drummer known for his work with Treat Her Right and Morphine. From 2013, he toured as a duo with Jeffrey Foucault. In his later years, he had also backed Chris Smither. A stripped-down approach characterized his bands, equipment, and playing.

== Background ==
William John Conway was a native of Owatonna, Minnesota, south of Minneapolis. In the 1970s, he attended Yale University, where he became friends and bandmates with harmonica player Jim Fitting, who would also become part of Treat Her Right. Conway earned a degree in psychology. A member of the Class of 1979, he was captain of Yale's ice hockey team as a senior in the 1978–79 season. He was invited to try out for the 1980 U.S. Olympic hockey team, which performed the "Miracle on Ice", but could not after tearing a knee ligament.

== Treat Her Right ==
After graduation, Conway and Fitting both moved to Boston, Massachusetts, where Conway taught at a school for emotionally disturbed adolescents. In 1985, they were introduced to the other two principals in Treat Her Right, Mark Sandman and David Champagne.

One of the notable features of Treat Her Right was the cocktail drum that Conway used. This band was noted for its spare, spacious sound, of which the cocktail drum was an integral part. As Jim Fitting put it, "We were trying to get away from the big rock sound that was predominant in the mid-eighties. Bill Conway played a cocktail drum that gave the music a much lighter touch than typical kick/snare thunder."

== Morphine ==
When Mark Sandman formed Morphine, the original drummer was Jerome Deupree, but Conway served in the band for much of its existence. He played a fuller drum kit, seated rather than standing. His cocktail drum appeared on some album cuts. The Rough Guide to Rock described him as playing jazz-influenced, very tight drums, but that he crucially left plenty of spaces for Sandman and the other member of the band, saxophonist Dana Colley, to make their noises.

== Subsequent bands ==
After Sandman suffered his fatal heart attack in 1999, Colley and Conway formed Orchestra Morphine, a group of Sandman's friends and colleagues who toured to celebrate the music of the band and to raise funds for the Mark Sandman Music Education Fund.

Colley and Conway also formed Twinemen with singer Laurie Sargent. Conway and Sargent were long-term partners.

Conway worked with Jeffrey Foucault and poet Lisa Olstein on the eponymous first album by Cold Satellite (2011) and the follow-up Cavalcade (2013). Previously, he had performed on albums by Kris Delmhorst, who became Foucault's wife.

Another part of this circle of artists is Caitlin Canty, whose 2015 album Reckless Skyline was produced by Foucault and employed Conway as drummer.

Foucault has cited a shared desire to give weight to space and silence, which was a constant in Conway's career. For their live gigs as a duo, they played only what they could carry into a club alone in one trip. Conway's minimal "suitcase drum" setup harked back to his use of the cocktail drum.

Conway occasionally joined Vapors of Morphine, which honors the legacy of Morphine, for some big shows.

He also continued to perform as a guest on albums and live dates by other artists. In particular, Chris Smither cited Conway's feel and intuition.

Conway was drummer on Early Riser, the ninth album by John Statz, recorded in 2019 and released in 2020.

In 2019, Conway, Fitting, and Champagne got together and recorded an album. A live date was announced for January 19, 2020 at Club Passim in Cambridge—which was to be their first appearance together on stage since all were members of Treat Her Right. Unfortunately, it was announced that week that Conway would not be able to perform at the event because of health issues and that Jerome Deupree and Larry Dersch would fill in. At the event Fitting told the audience Conway had restarted cancer treatment. His diagnosis was made more public later that year. He was originally diagnosed with bowel cancer in October 2018.

== Solo album ==
Despite his health challenges, and in part because of them, Conway released his first solo album, Outside Inside, in 2020. It was accompanied by a new album from Sargent.

== As producer ==
Conway served as a producer and engineer. This arose in his prior capacity as a founder of Hi-n-Dry, but he also oversaw two of Kris Delmhorst's albums, Five Stories and Songs for a Hurricane.

== Death ==
Conway's cancer spread to his liver, and he died on December 19, 2021, one day after his 65th birthday.

Jeffrey Foucault paid tribute to Conway in these words: "Billy Conway was one of the best drummers America produced in the second half of the twentieth century. With his uncanny empathy and sensitivity, his dedication to simplicity and restraint, and his impossible spiritual power, he played the song, never the instrument, and when he played he was undeniable. He incarnated a ferocious love."
