= Ethiopiques Vol. 20: Live in Addis =

Ethiopiques, Vol. 20: Either/Orchestra Live in Addis

Live album by Either/Orchestra
- Released: September 13, 2005
- Recorded: January 21, 2004
- Studios: Ethiopian Music Festival, Addis Ababa, Ethiopia
- Genre: Jazz
- Length: 1:46:07
- Labels: Buda Musique, 860121
- Producer: Russ Gershon

Either/Orchestra chronology
Neo-Modernism (2003)	Ethiopiques, Vol. 20: Either/Orchestra Live in Addis (2005)	Mood Music for Time Travellers (2010)

Ethiopiques, Vol. 20: Either/Orchestra Live in Addis is an album by the Either/Orchestra recorded live in Addis Ababa, Ethiopia at the Hilton Addis Ababa, January 21, 2004 as part of the third Ethiopian Music Festival which was curated by French musicologist and producer Francis Falceto and presented by Alliance Ethio-Française. Ethiopiques, Vol. 20: Either/Orchestra Live in Addis was released by the Buda Musique label in 2005. The album was originally released as two CDs.

== Track listing ==
1. "Amlak Abét Abét" (Tèshomè Sissay) – 15:30
2. "Muziqawi Silt" (Girma Bèyènè) – 8:00
3. "Feqer Aydèlem Wèy" (Ayaléw Mèsfin) – 9:05
4. "Altchalkoum" (Afèwèrq Yohannes) – 7:12
5. "Yèzèmèd Yèbada" (Abubaker Ashiké, Tèshomè Mitiku) – 8:05
6. "Soul Tezeta" (Traditional) 5:58
7. "Antchim Endèléla" (Bahta Gèbrè-Heywèt, Gèbrèab Tèfèri) – 7:25
8. "Kèsét Eswa Betcha" (Shewalul Mengistu) – 12:39
9. "Bati" (Bass Intro) – 1:38
10. "Bati" (Traditional) – 8:51
11. "Shellèla" (Gétatchèw Mèkurya) – 7:41
12. "Embi Ba" (Mahmoud Ahmed) – 10:55

== Personnel ==
- Russ Gershon – tenor saxophone, soprano saxophone
- Colin Fisher – trumpet
- Tom Halter – trumpet
- Joel Yennoir – trombone
- Jeremy Udden– alto saxophone
- Gétatchèw Mèkurya – saxophone
- Henry Cook – saxophone, flute
- Vicente Lebron – bongos, congas, percussion
- Gregory Burk – piano
- Rick McLaughlin – bass
- Harvey Whirt – cowbells, cymbals, drums
- Luke Wasserman – engineer
- Wilfrid Harpaillé – mastering
- Francis Falceto, Russ Gershon – producers
- Michael Bèlaynèh – vocals (Soul Tezeta)
- Bahta Gèbrè-Heywèt – vocals (Antchim Endèléla)
- Tsèdènia Gèbrè-Marqos – vocals (Bati)
