= Neo-Modernism =

Studio album by Either/Orchestra
- Released: September 2, 2003
- Recorded: June 5, 2001 - June 7, 2001
- Studio: SoundStation 7, Providence, Rhode Island
- Genre: Jazz
- Length: 43:34
- Label: Accurate (AC-3284)
- Producer: Russ Gershon

Either/Orchestra chronology
Afro-Cubism (2002)	Neo-Modernism (2003)	Ethiopiques Vol. 20: Live in Addis (2005)

Neo-Modernism is an album by the Either/Orchestra recorded in 2001 and released by the Accurate Records label in 2003.

== Track listing ==
1. "Los Olvidados" (Russ Gershon) – 7:25
2. "Baby Invents Monk" (Russ Gershon) – 6:58
3. "The Modernist" (Russ Gershon) – 9:17
4. "Fast Edd" (Bob Nieske) – 7:13
5. "Heavily Amplified Hairpiece" (Russ Gershon) – 8:35

== Personnel ==
- Russ Gershon – tenor saxophone, soprano saxophone, composer, arranger, mixing
- Colin Fisher – trumpet, flugelhorn
- Tom Halter – trumpet, flugelhorn
- Joel Yennoir – trombone
- Jeremy Udden – alto saxophone, flute
- Charlie Kohlhase – baritone saxophone
- Vicente Lebron – bongos, congas, percussion
- Gregory Burk – Fender Rhodes, Moog Synthesizer, Piano, Univox
- Rick McLaughlin – bass
- Harvey Whirt – cowbells, cymbals, drums
- Paul Q. Kolderie – mixing
- Rob Pemberton – engineer
