= Deaths in 1977 =

The following is a list of notable deaths in 1977. Entries for each day are listed alphabetically by surname. A typical entry lists information in the following sequence:

- Name, age, country of citizenship at birth, subsequent country of citizenship (if applicable), reason for notability, cause of death (if known), and reference.

== Deaths in 1977 ==
=== January ===
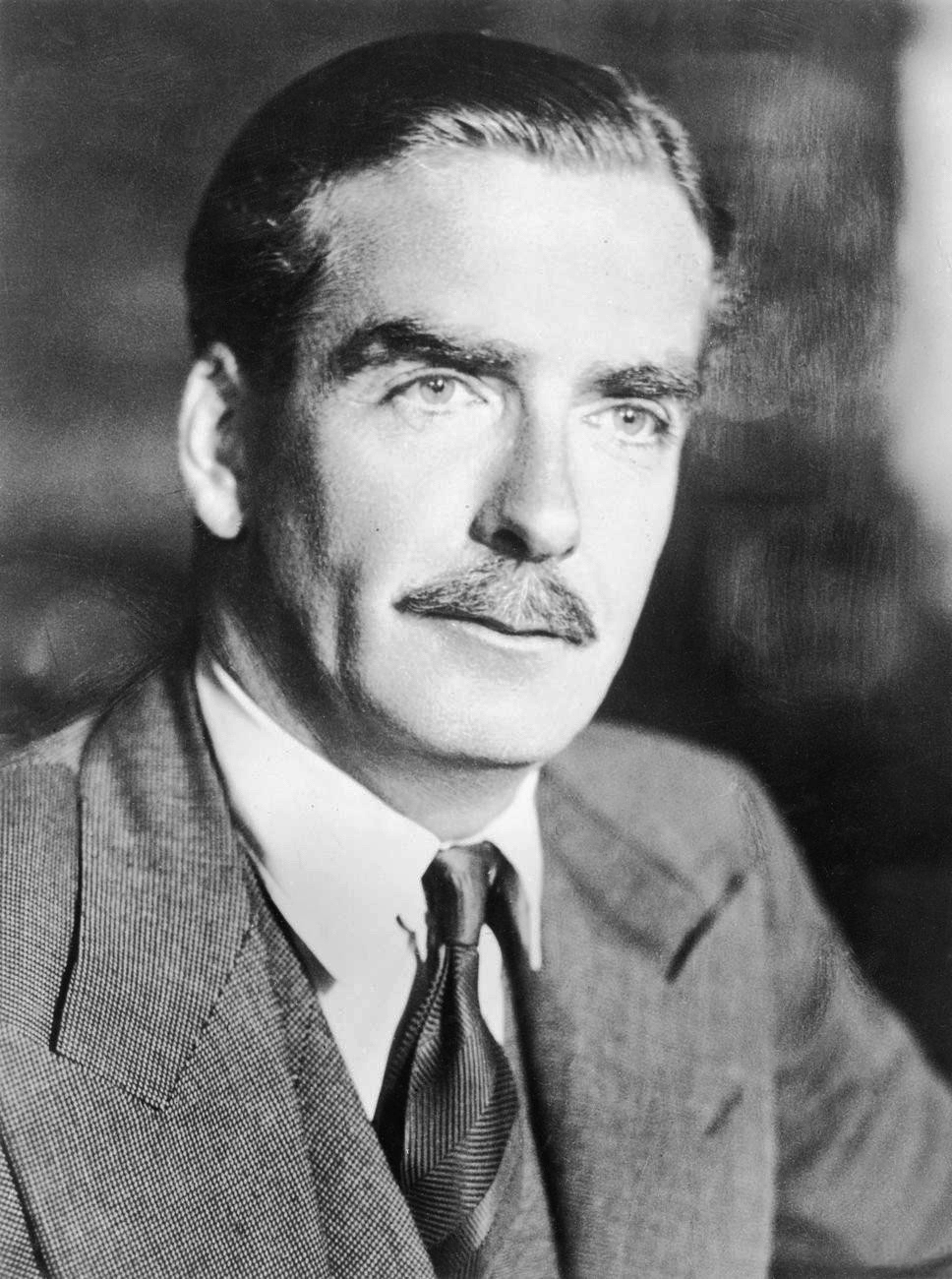
Anthony Eden

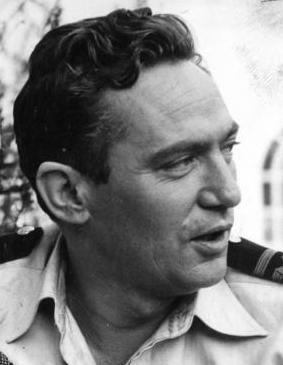
Peter Finch

- January 2 – Erroll Garner, American musician (b. 1921)
- January 4 – Ibrahim Biçakçiu, Albanian politician, 2-time Prime Minister of Albania leader of World War II (b. 1905)
- January 5 – Artur Adson, Estonian poet, writer and theatre critic (b. 1889)
- January 14
  - Anthony Eden, British politician, 62nd prime minister of the United Kingdom (b. 1897)
  - Peter Finch, English-born actor (b. 1916)
  - Anaïs Nin, French-born American diarist and writer (b. 1903)
- January 17 – Gary Gilmore, American murderer (b. 1940)
- January 18
  - Džemal Bijedić, Yugoslavian politician, 27th prime minister of Yugoslavia (b. 1917)
  - Carl Zuckmayer, German writer and playwright (b. 1896)
- January 19 – Yvonne Printemps, French singer and actress (b. 1894)
- January 20 – Dimitrios Kiousopoulos, Prime Minister of Greece (b. 1892)
- January 23 – Pascual Pérez, Argentine world Flyweight boxing champion (b. 1926)
- January 26 – Dietrich von Hildebrand, German philosopher and theologian (b. 1889)
- January 28
  - Burt Mustin, American actor (b. 1884)
  - Talib Haji Hamzah, Malaysian armed robber executed in Singapore (b. 1953)
- January 29
  - Freddie Prinze, American actor and comedian (b. 1954)
  - Johnny Franz, English record producer (b. 1922)

=== February ===
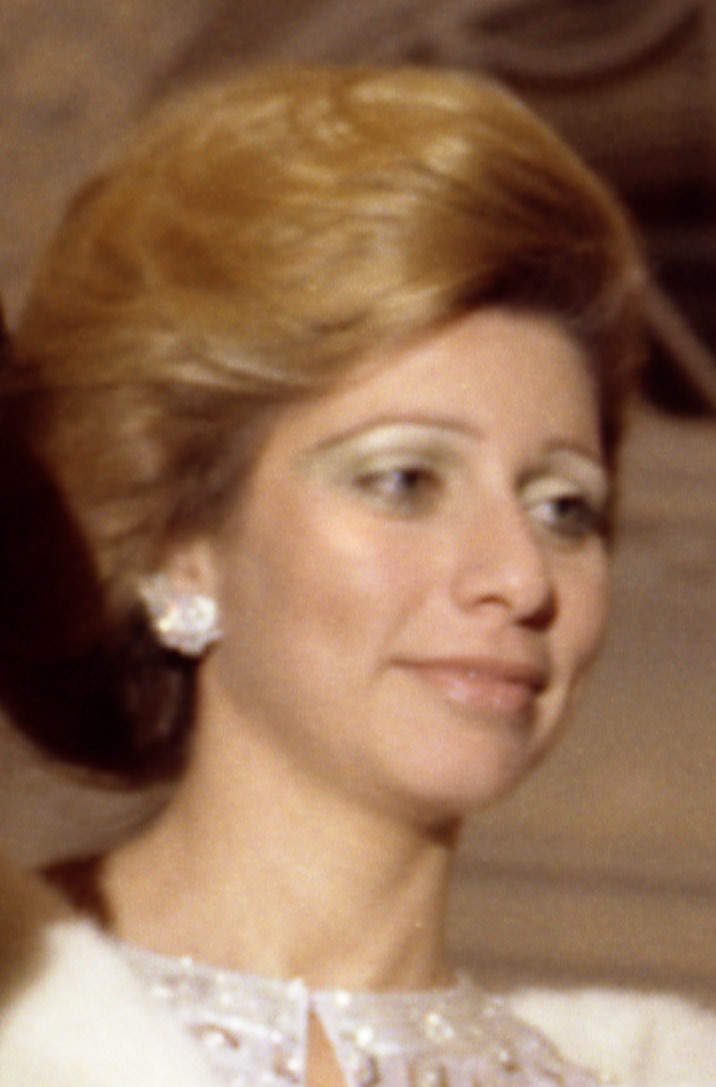
Alia Toukan

- February 3 – Pauline Starke, American actress (b. 1901)
- February 5 – Oskar Klein, Swedish theoretical physicist (b. 1894)
- February 9 – Alia Toukan, Queen consort of Jordan (b. 1948)
- February 11
  - Fakhruddin Ali Ahmed, Indian lawyer and statesman, 5th president of India (b. 1905)
  - Louis Beel, prime minister of the Netherlands (b. 1902)
- February 16 – Rózsa Péter, Hungarian mathematician (b. 1905)
- February 18
  - Newsboy Brown, American boxer (b. 1905)
  - Andy Devine, American actor (b. 1905)
- February 27
  - John Dickson Carr, American crime novelist (b. 1906)
  - Allison Hayes, American actress (b. 1930)
- February 28 – Eddie "Rochester" Anderson, American actor (b. 1905)

=== March ===
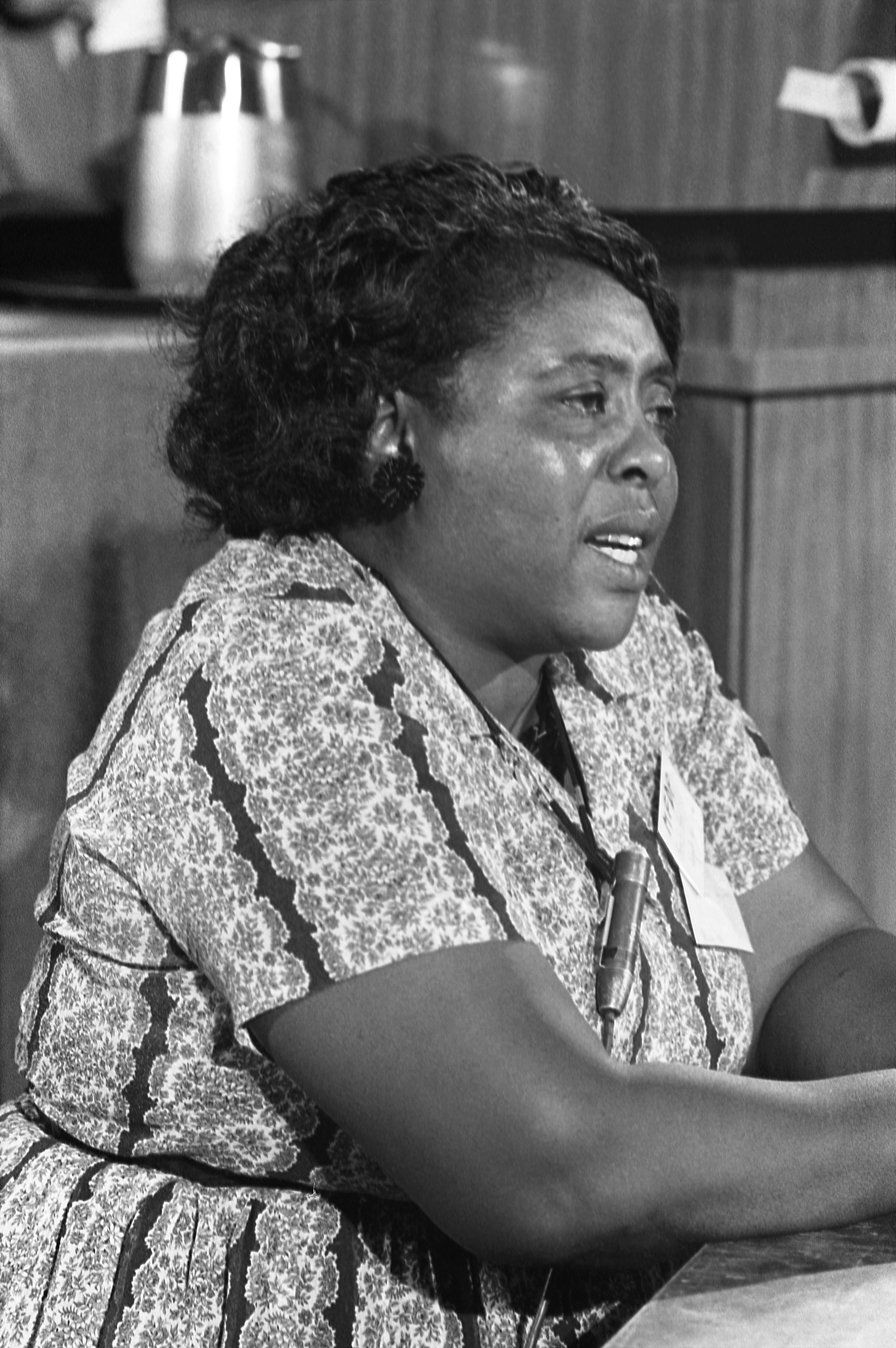
Fannie Lou Hamer

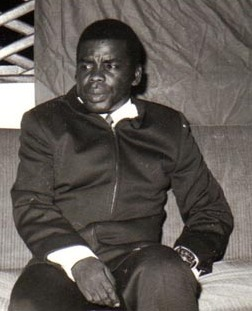
Marien Ngouabi

- March 1 – Diallo Telli, Guinean diplomat and politician, 1st secretary general of the Organisation of African Unity (b. 1925)
- March 3 – Brian Faulkner, last prime minister of Northern Ireland (b. 1921)
- March 4
  - Andrés Caicedo, Colombian writer (b. 1951)
  - Lutz Graf Schwerin von Krosigk, German jurist and senior government official, last führer of Nazi Germany (b. 1887)
- March 5 – Tom Pryce, British Formula One racing driver (b. 1949)
- March 8 – Henry Hull, American actor (b. 1890)
- March 10
  - E. Power Biggs, English-American organist (b. 1906)
  - Willem Schermerhorn, Dutch politician and civil engineer, 28th prime minister of the Netherlands (b. 1894)
- March 14
  - Cynthia Carew Pole, British socialite and local councillor (b. 1908)
  - Fannie Lou Hamer, American civil rights activist (b. 1917)
- March 15 – Antonino Rocca, Italian professional wrestler (b. 1921)
- March 18 – Marien Ngouabi, 3rd president of Congo (b. 1938)
- March 19
  - William L. Laurence, Lithuanian-born American science journalist (b. 1888)
  - Pehr Victor Edman, Swedish chemist (b. 1916)
- March 20 – Charles Lyttelton, 10th Viscount Cobham, English politician, 9th Governor-General of New Zealand (b. 1909)
- March 22 – Ernest Gugenheim, French rabbi (b. 1916)
- March 27 – Diana Hyland, American actress (b. 1936)
- March 29 –
  - Eugen Wüster, industrialist and terminologist (b. 1898)
  - Charles Nicoletti, Chicago mafioso, shot in the back of the head three times as he sat in his car.
- March 30 – Abdel Halim Hafez, Egyptian singer and actor (b. 1929)

=== April ===
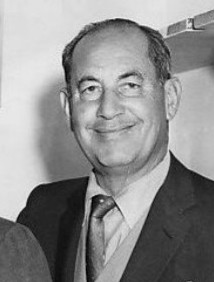
Gummo Marx

- April 2 – John Whitaker, British gymnast (b. 1886)
- April 5 – Carlos Prío Socarrás, 11th president of Cuba (b. 1903)
- April 7 – Karl Ritter, German film producer and director (b. 1888)
- April 11 – Jacques Prévert, French poet and screenwriter (b. 1900)
- April 17 – William Conway, Northern Irish cardinal (b. 1913)
- April 20 – Wilmer Allison, American tennis champion (b. 1904)
- April 21 – Gummo Marx, American actor and comedian (b. 1892)
- April 28
  - Ricardo Cortez, American actor (b. 1899)
  - Sepp Herberger, German footballer and manager (b. 1897)

=== May ===
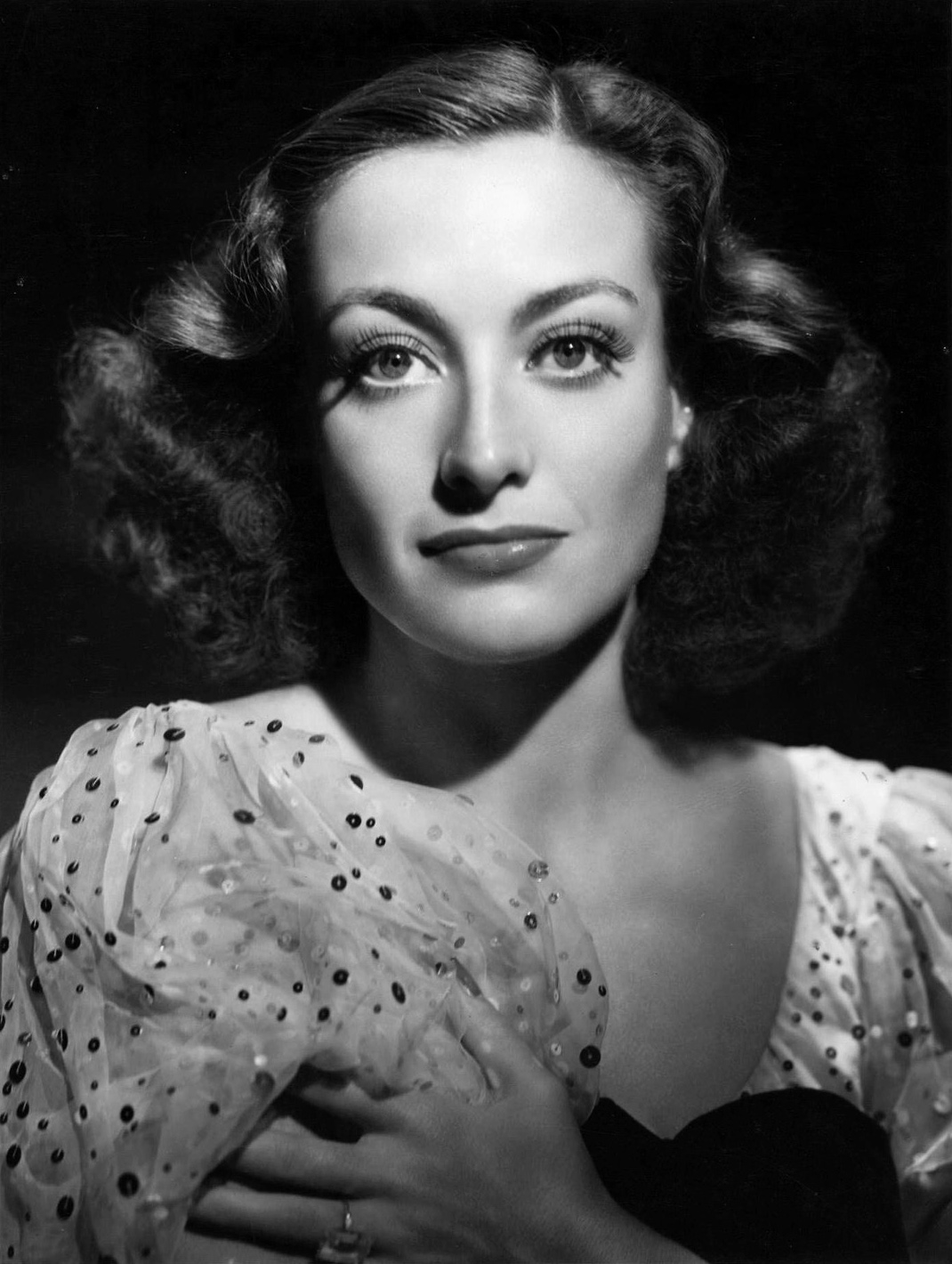
Joan Crawford

- May 5 – Ludwig Erhard, German politician, 28th Chancellor of Germany (West Germany) (b. 1897)
- May 7 – Prince Xavier of Bourbon-Parma, Spanish Carlist pretender (b. 1889)
- May 9 – James Jones, American writer (b. 1921)
- May 10 – Joan Crawford, American actress (b. c. 1904)
- May 13 – Otto Deßloch, German World War II Luftwaffe general (b. 1889)
- May 15 – Herbert Wilcox, British film director and producer (b. 1892)
- May 16 – Modibo Keïta, 1st president of Mali (b. 1915)
- May 25 – Willoughby Norrie, British army general and Governor-General of New Zealand (b. 1893)
- May 26 – Shewalul Mengistu, Ethiopian poet and political activist (b. 1944)
- May 30 – Paul Desmond, American jazz saxophonist and composer (b. 1924)
- May 31 – William Castle, American film director (b. 1914)

=== June ===
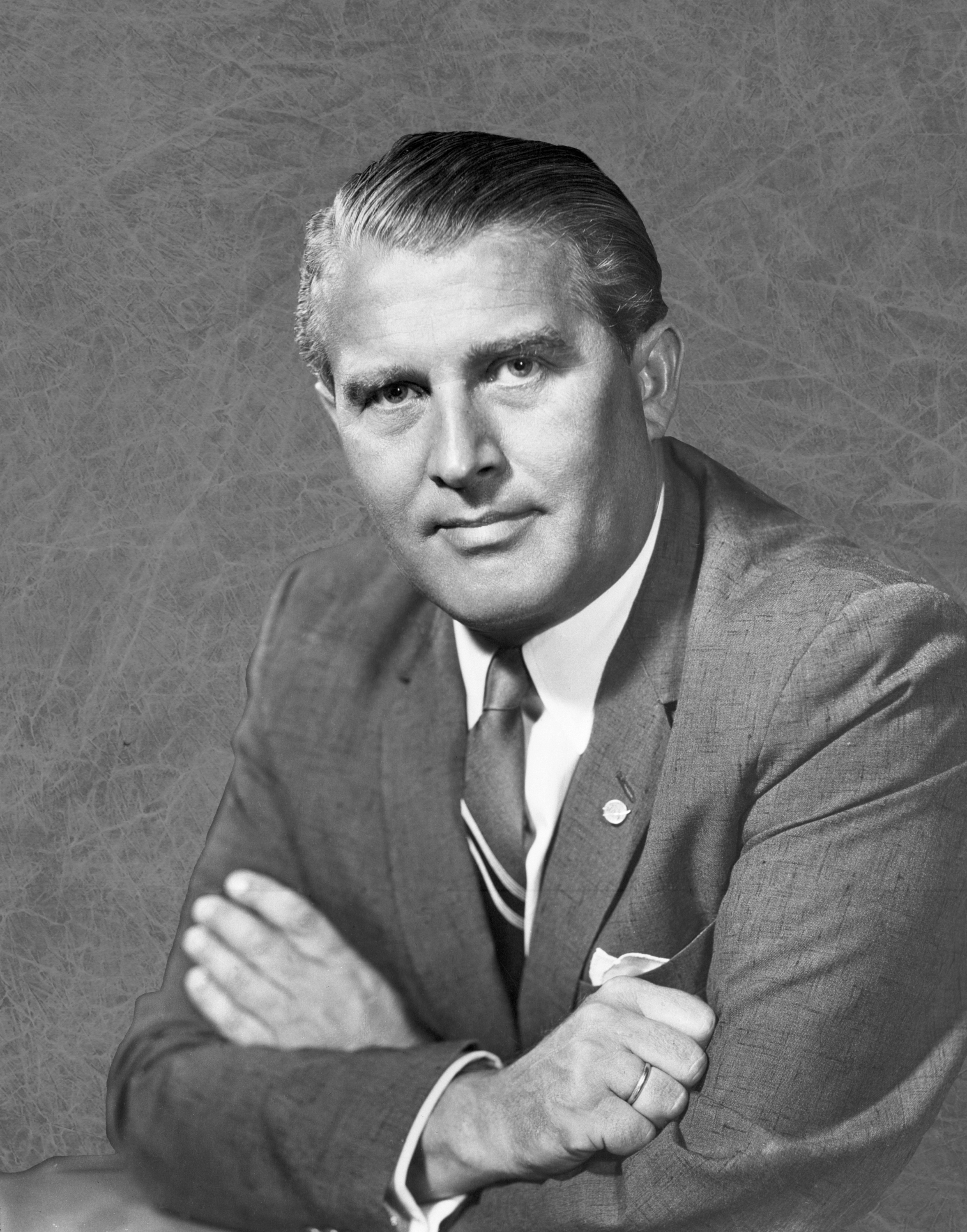
Wernher von Braun

- June 2 – Stephen Boyd, Northern Irish actor (b. 1931)
- June 3
  - Archibald Hill, English physiologist, Nobel Prize laureate (b. 1886)
  - Roberto Rossellini, Italian film director (b. 1906)
- June 13 – Tom C. Clark, American lawyer and politician (b. 1899)
- June 14 – Alan Reed, American actor (b. 1907)
- June 16 – Wernher von Braun, German-born American rocket scientist (b. 1912)
- June 22 – Marston Morse, American mathematician (b. 1892)
- June 25 – Olave Baden-Powell, first Chief Guide for Britain (b. 1889)
- June 26 – Sergei Lemeshev, Russian operatic lyric tenor (b. 1902)
- June 30 – Paul Hartmann, American actor (b. 1889)

=== July ===
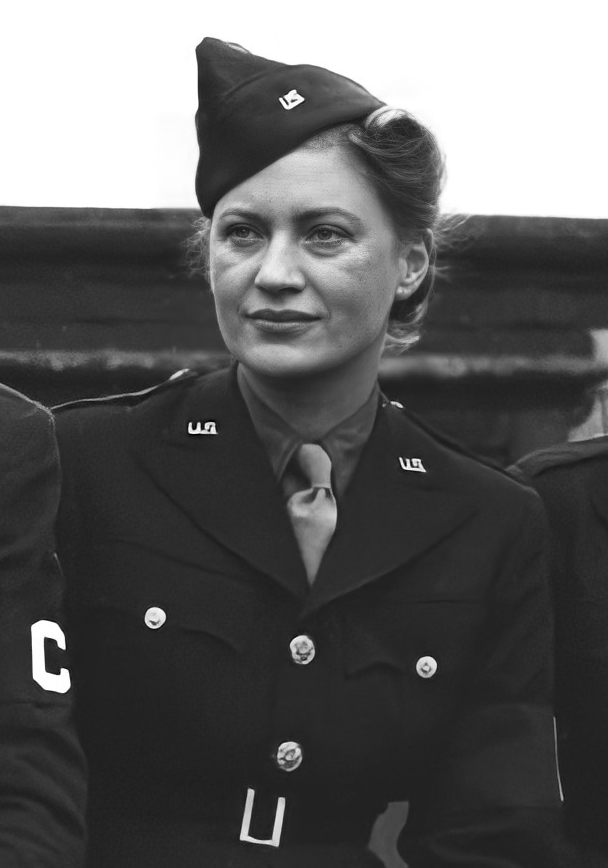
Lee Miller

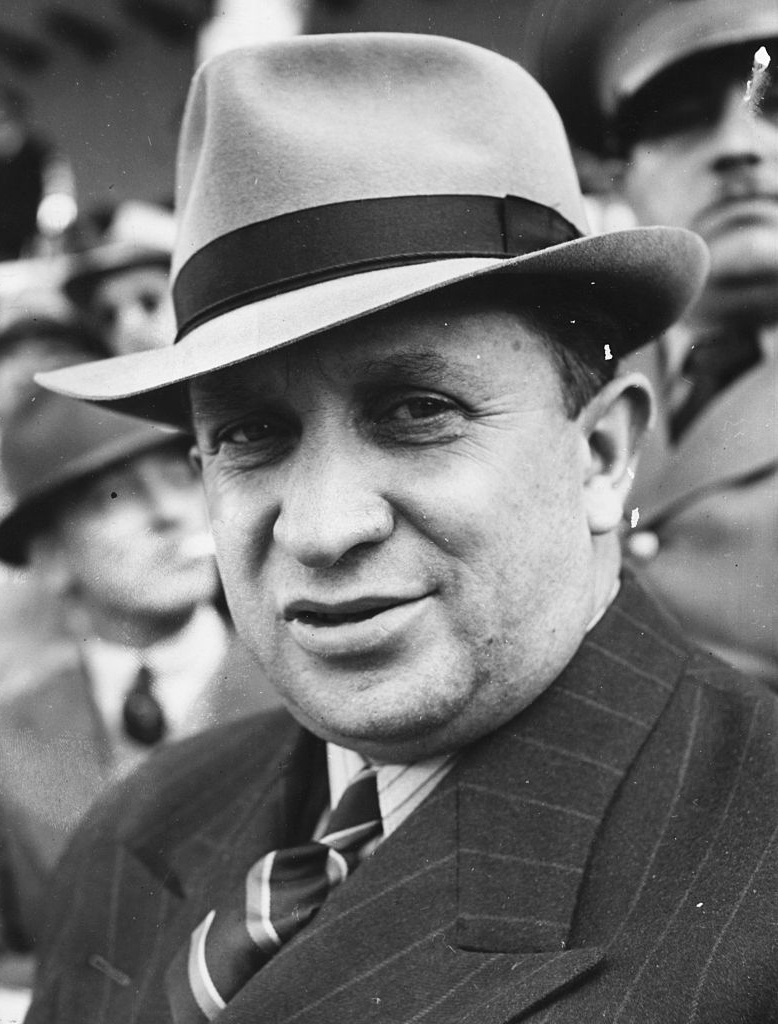
David Toro

- July 2 – Vladimir Nabokov, Russian-born American writer (b. 1899)
- July 9
  - Loren Eiseley, American anthropologist and author (b. 1907)
  - Alice Paul, American women's rights activist (b. 1885)
- July 21 – Lee Miller, American model and wartime photojournalist (b. 1907)
- July 23 – Arsenio Erico, Paraguayan footballer (b. 1915)
- July 25 – David Toro, 35th president of Bolivia (b. 1898)
- July 26 – Prince Charles of Luxembourg, Prince of Luxembourg (b. 1927)
- July 30 – Jean de Laborde, French admiral (b. 1878)
- July 31 – Giuseppe Castellano, Italian general (b. 1893)

=== August ===
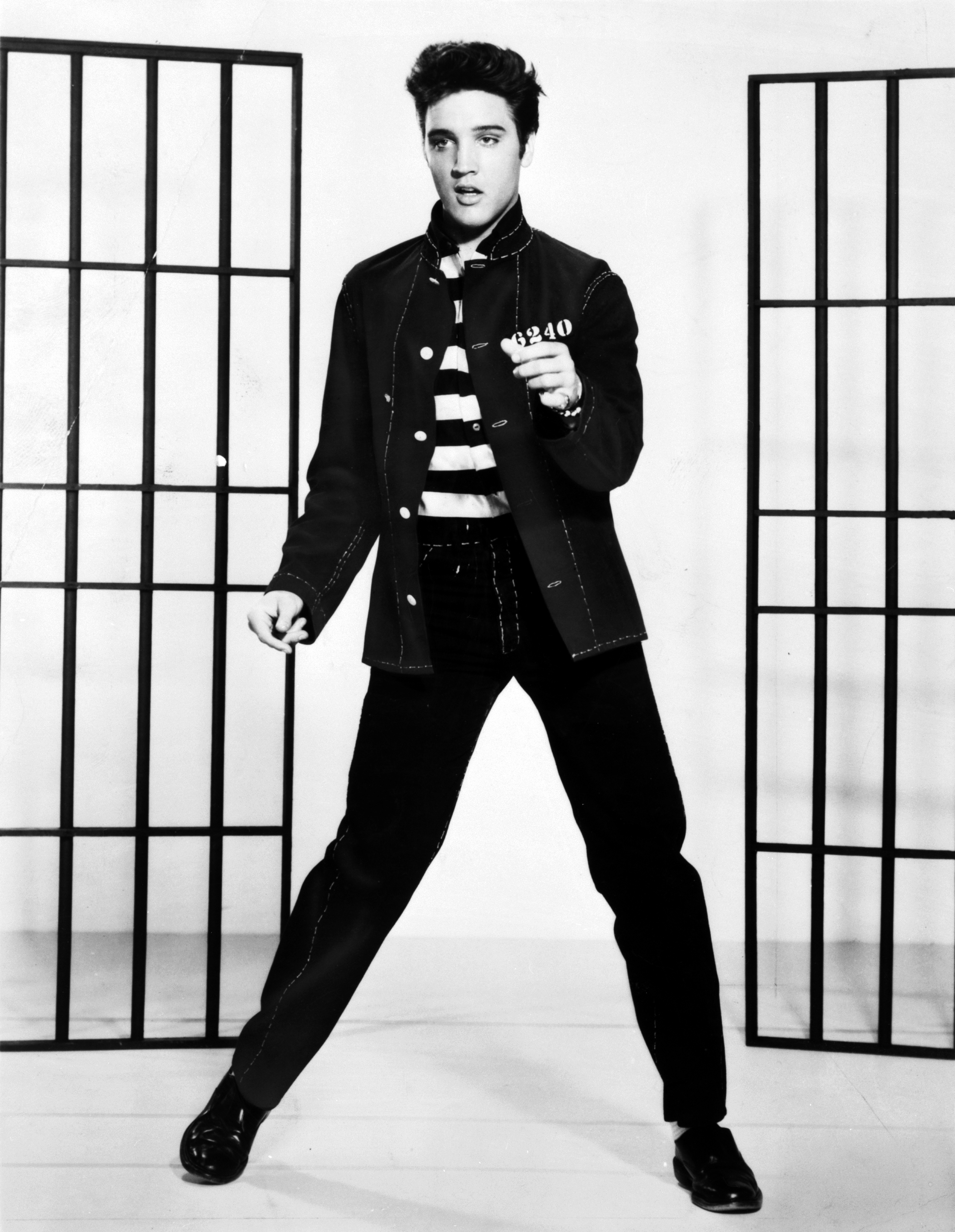
Elvis Presley

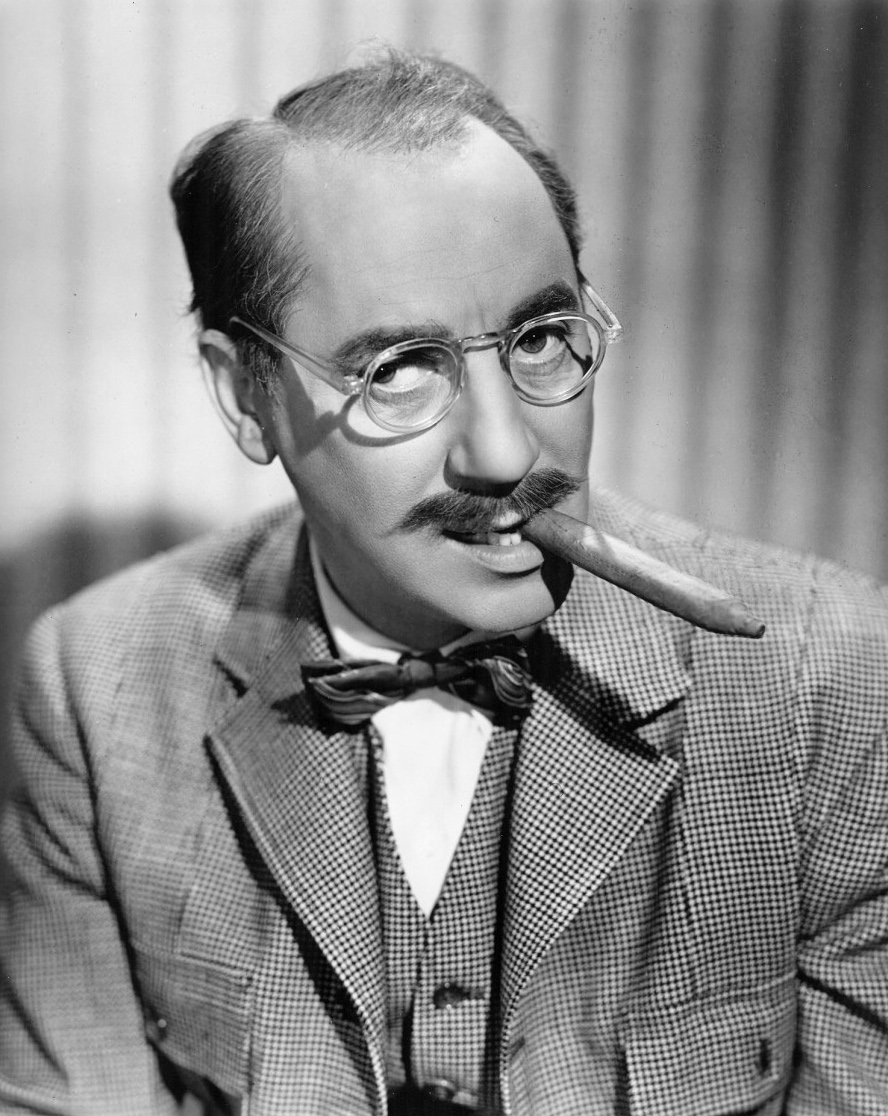
Groucho Marx

- August 1 –
  - Francis Gary Powers, American U-2 spy plane pilot (b. 1929)
  - Manuel Gonçalves Cerejeira, Portuguese Roman Catholic cardinal (b. 1888)
- August 3
  - Alfred Lunt, American actor (b. 1892)
  - Makarios III, Greek-Cypriot archbishop, 1st president of Cyprus (b. 1913)
- August 4
  - Edgar Adrian, 1st Baron Adrian, English physiologist, Nobel Prize laureate (b. 1889)
  - Ernst Bloch, German Marxist philosopher (b. 1885)
- August 6 – Sir Alexander Bustamente, Jamaican politician, 1st prime minister of Jamaica (b. 1884)
- August 8 – Sơn Ngọc Thành, 2nd prime minister of Cambodia (b. 1908)
- August 9 – Beryl May Dent, English mathematical physicist (b. 1900)
- August 13 – Henry Williamson, English naturalist, farmer and prolific ruralist (b. 1895)
- August 14 – Alexander Luria, Russian neuropsychologist (b. 1902)
- August 16 – Elvis Presley, American actor, musician and singer-songwriter (b. 1935)
- August 19 – Groucho Marx, American actor and comedian (b. 1890)
- August 23
  - Sebastian Cabot, English actor (b. 1918)
  - Naum Gabo, Russian sculptor (b. 1890)
- August 29 – Jean Hagen, American actress (b. 1923)

=== September ===
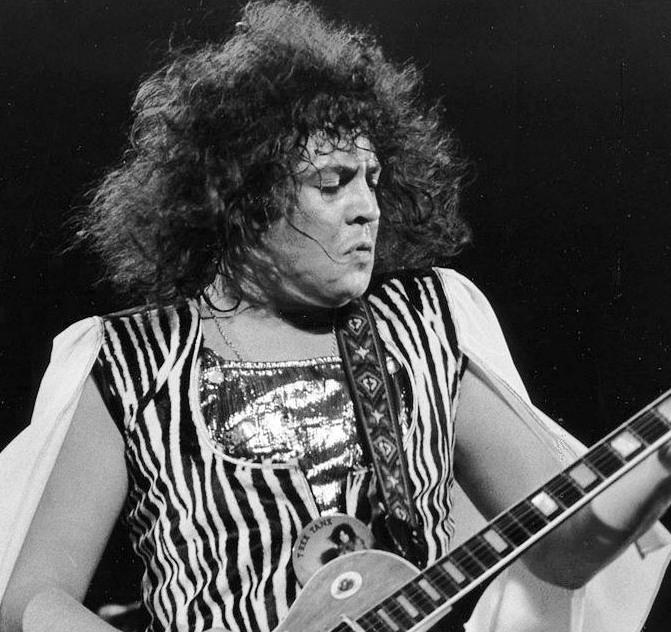
Marc Bolan

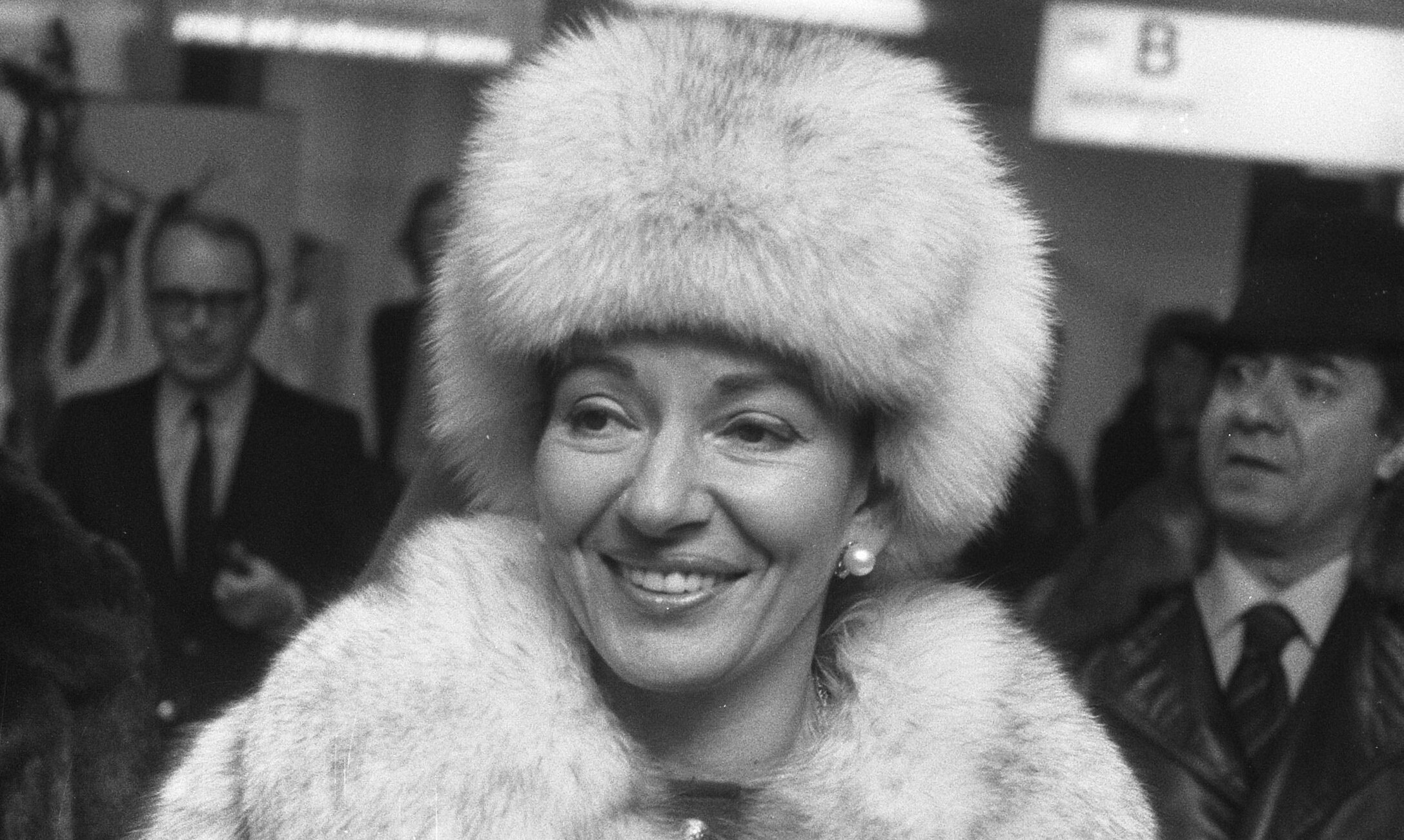
Maria Callas

- September 1 – Ethel Waters, American singer and actress (b. 1896)
- September 4 – E. F. Schumacher, German-born British statistician and economist (b. 1885)
- September 6 – John Edensor Littlewood, British mathematician (b. 1885)
- September 8 – Zero Mostel, American actor (b. 1915)
- September 12
  - Steve Biko, South African anti-apartheid activist (b. 1946)
  - Robert Lowell, American poet (b. 1916)
- September 13 – Leopold Stokowski, English conductor (b. 1882)
- September 16
  - Marc Bolan, British singer and guitarist (b. 1947)
  - Maria Callas, Greek soprano (b. 1923)
- September 18 – Paul Bernays, Swiss mathematician (b. 1888)

=== October ===
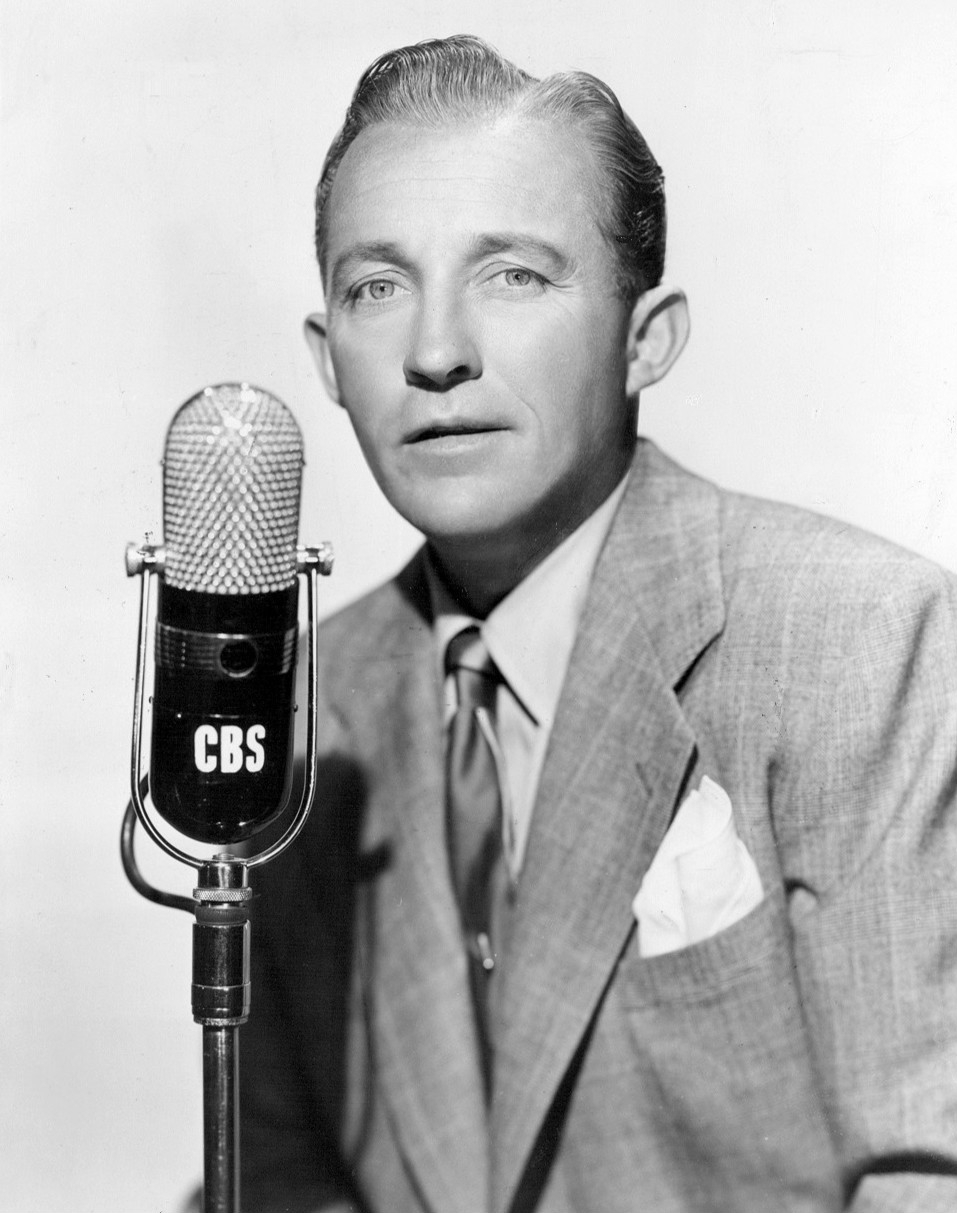
Bing Crosby

- October 3 – Tay Garnett, American film director (b. 1894)
- October 10 – Jean Duvieusart, Belgian politician, 36th prime minister of Belgium (b. 1900)
- October 11 – MacKinlay Kantor, American writer and historian (b. 1904)
- October 12 – Dorothy Davenport, American actress (b. 1895)
- October 14 – Bing Crosby, American pop singer and actor (b. 1903)
- October 17 – Sir Michael Balcon, English film producer (b. 1896)
- October 20 – Three members of American rock group, Lynyrd Skynyrd, killed in plane crash:
  - Ronnie Van Zant, lead singer (b. 1948)
  - Cassie Gaines, lead singer (b. 1948)
  - Steve Gaines, lead singer and guitarist (b. 1949)
- October 25 – Félix Gouin, French politician (b. 1884)
- October 27
  - James M. Cain, American writer (b. 1892)
  - Miguel Mihura, Spanish playwright (b. 1905)

=== November ===
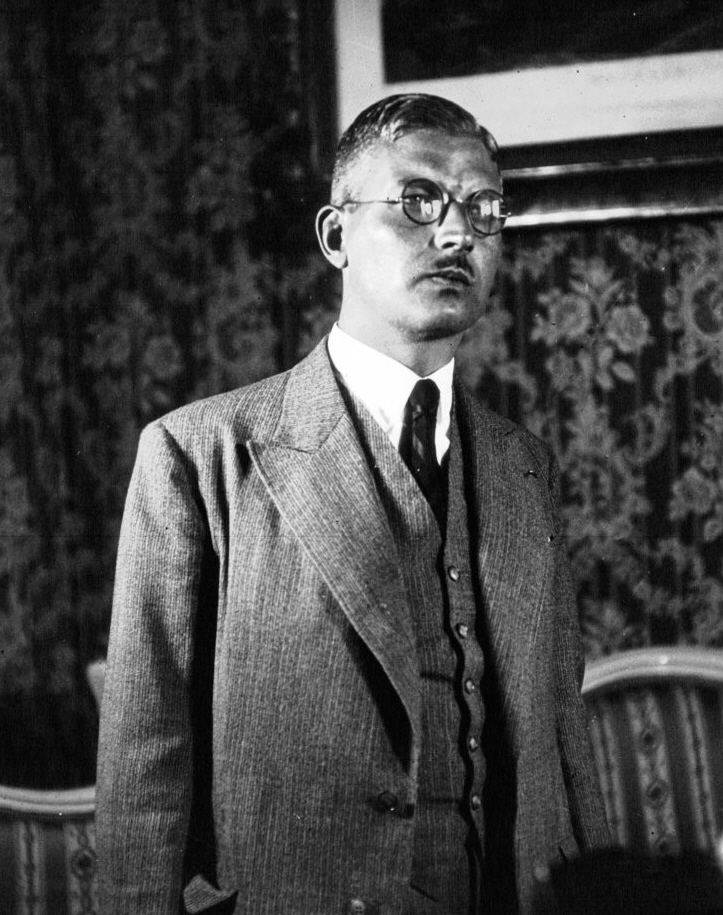
Kurt Schuschnigg

- November 3 – Florence Vidor, American actress (b. 1895)
- November 4 – Betty Balfour, English screen actress (b. 1902)
- November 5
  - René Goscinny, French comic book writer (b. 1926)
  - Guy Lombardo, Canadian-American bandleader (b. 1902)
- November 9 – Gertrude Astor, American actress (b. 1887)
- November 10 – Dennis Wheatley, English writer (b. 1897)
- November 14– A. C. Bhaktivedanta Swami Prabhupada, Indian religious leader (b. 1896)
- November 16 – Princess Charlotte, Duchess of Valentinois (b. 1898), Monégasque princess
- November 18
  - Victor Francen, Belgian actor (b. 1888)
  - Kurt Schuschnigg, 11th chancellor of Austria (b. 1897)
- November 25 – Richard Carlson, American actor (b. 1912)
- November 30 – Olga Petrova, English-born American actress (b. 1884)

=== December ===
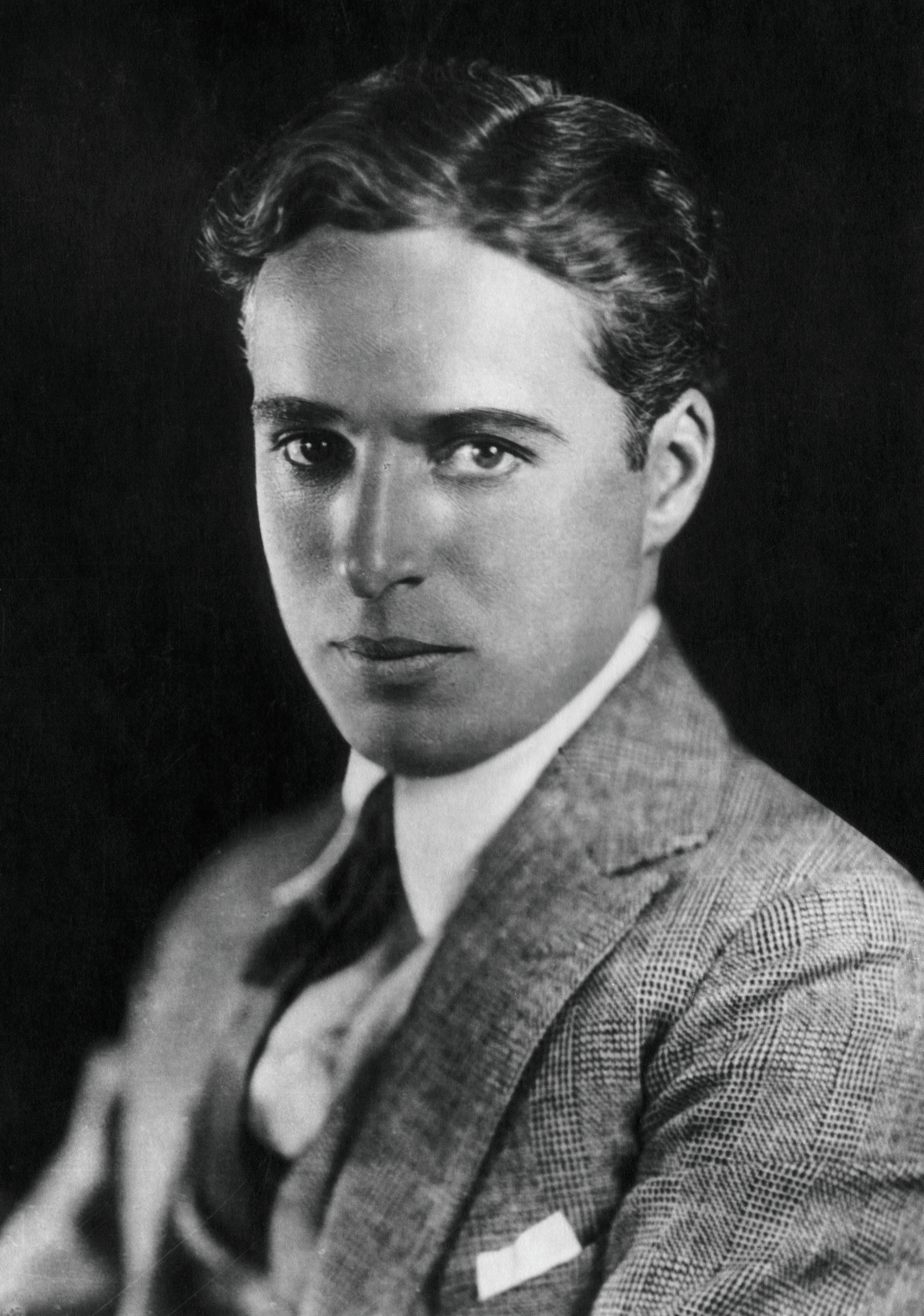
Sir Charlie Chaplin

- December 3 – Jack Beresford, British Olympic rower (b. 1899)
- December 5 – Aleksandr Vasilevsky, Soviet general, Marshal of the Soviet Union (b. 1895)
- December 9 – Clarice Lispector, Ukrainian-born Brazilian novelist (b. 1920)
- December 10 – Adolph Rupp, American college basketball coach (b. 1901)
- December 12 – Clementine Churchill, wife of Winston Churchill (b. 1885)
- December 16
  - Gustaf Aulén, Bishop of Strängnäs in the Church of Sweden (b. 1879)
  - Yngve Larsson, Swedish politician (b. 1881)
- December 19
  - Takeo Kurita, Japanese admiral (b. 1889)
  - Nellie Tayloe Ross, American politician (b. 1876)
  - Jacques Tourneur, French-American filmmaker (b. 1904)
- December 24 – Juan Velasco Alvarado, 58th president of Peru (b. 1910)
- December 25
  - Sir Charlie Chaplin, British actor, producer and director (b. 1889)
  - Oliver P. Smith, American general (b. 1893)
- December 26 – Howard Hawks, American film director (b. 1896)
- December 28 – Charlotte Greenwood, American actress (b. 1890)
