= Radium (Either Orchestra album) =

Studio album by Either/Orchestra
- Released: 1988
- Recorded: August 2, 1987 - January 31, 1988
- Studio: The Outpost, Stoughton, MA and Ryles Jazz Club, Cambridge, MA
- Genre: Jazz
- Length: 1:08:55
- Label: Accurate (AC-3232)
- Producer: Russ Gershon

Either/Orchestra chronology
Dial "E" (1987)	Radium (1988)	The Half-Life of Desire (1990)

Radium is an album by the Either/Orchestra recorded in 1987 and 1988 and released by the Accurate Records label in 1988. Radium was nominated a Boston Music Award for Outstanding Jazz Album (Indie) in 1989.

== Track listing ==
1. "Born in a Suitcase" (Russ Gershon) – 6:44
2. "Hard to Know" (Russ Gershon) – 5:00
3. "Moanin’ (Introduction)" (Charlie Kohlhase) – 2:59
4. "Moanin’" (Charles Mingus) – 7:55
5. “Insomnia” (Russ Gershon) – 12:22
6. "Nutty/Ode to Billie Joe” (Thelonious Monk/Bobbie Gentry) – 7:33
7. "Odwallah" (Roscoe Mitchell) – 10:53
8. "Willow Weep for Me" (Ann Ronell) – 15:40

== Personnel ==
- Russ Gershon – tenor saxophone, soprano saxophone, flute, arranger
- John Carlson – trumpet, flugelhorn
- Tom Halter – trumpet, flugelhorn
- Curtis Hasselbring – trombone
- Russell Jewell – trombone
- Charlie Kohlhase – alto saxophone, baritone saxophone
- John Dirac – electric guitar, arranger
- Mike Rivard – bass
- Jerome Deupree – drums
- Robb Rawlings – alto saxophone
- Kenny Freundlich – piano, synthesizer
- George Hicks – engineer, producer
