= Megalopolis (soundtrack) =

2024 film soundtrack album

Megalopolis (Original Motion Picture Soundtrack)

Soundtrack album by Osvaldo Golijov
- Released: September 27, 2024
- Recorded: February 2024
- Studios: Studio 22, East Connection Music Recording, Budapest, Hungary
- Genre: Film score
- Length: 82:14
- Label: Milan
- Producer: Osvaldo Golijov

Osvaldo Golijov chronology
La Nuit des Chevaux Volants (2021)	Megalopolis (Original Motion Picture Soundtrack) (2024)

Megalopolis (Original Motion Picture Soundtrack) is the soundtrack album to the 2024 epic science fiction drama film Megalopolis, directed by Francis Ford Coppola. The album consisted of 32 tracks, predominantly featuring the musical score composed by Osvaldo Golijov and classical music heard in the film. The soundtrack was released under the Milan Records label on September 27, 2024.

== Background ==
Coppola, who refrained from working with a Hollywood composer for scoring Megalopolis, eventually listened to Golijov's compositions which he liked it and in turn, he handwrote a letter to Golijov in 2003 to invite him at his residence in Napa Valley, California so that he could discuss the project. Golijov obliged with his offer and read the script together which he found fascinating. Coppola then asked the musician to compose a symphony that would have dictated the film's rhythm, and would be used even before the start of production.

Golijov stated that: "It would be set in New York in the near future, but it would also reflect Rome in its decadence [...] It would be an epic, with an intermission, like an opera." Megalopolis was abandoned as the project did not get the financial backing and Coppola would later collaborate with Golijov on Youth Without Youth (2007), Tetro (2009) and Twixt (2011). When Megalopolis was relaunched in late-2019, Coppola invited Golijov again to write the score and sent him the new script.

== Production ==
In February 2023, Golijov visited the sets at Atlanta and met Coppola where he insisted to compose a love theme in the lines of Pyotr Ilyich Tchaikovsky's composition Romeo and Juliet (1870). After the production wrapped, Coppola showed the final edit to Golijov where he insisted him to "think of the music and the film as an adventure" and provided him the creative freedom to sketch the themes and cues.

Golijov admitted on expressing time in numerous ways. Cesar's time-stopping "superpower" had the use of the love theme that was played by a musical saw in a "non-realistic, spooky way". Given that Coppola's ways of using unusual and specific musical touches for each film, Golijov attributed that "the color of the musical saw and of the glass harmonica provide those fingerprints for the eerie cues" while the organ had been used prominently in the Madison Square Garden sequence. He further wanted the score to blur the line between music and sound design, where Coppola wanted the rhythm to be natural and envisioned the texture of the film as a constant rhythm. In practical aspects, each orchestral cue demanded a clear rhythmic, propulsive element.

Given the ambiguity surrounding how the city and the music of Rome surrounded, he relied on Hollywood portrayals and composed a Roman suite inspired by Miklós Rózsa's score for Ben-Hur (1959). He described the suite as an independent musical piece, but the themes stem from the Roman themes in the film, where at times it would establish a grandeur throughout the sequence. The Madison Square Garden sequence is a film-within-a-film narrative which demanded more music and as Coppola liked the Roman suite, he extracted several cues on it which would be used in multiple sequences.

== Recording ==
The score was recorded at the Studio 22 in East Connection Music Recording located at Budapest, Hungary. Arturo Rodriguez conducted the score performed by Budapest Art Orchestra and provided orchestrations with Golijov and Kris Kukul. Percussionists Cyro Baptista, Jamey Haddad, saxophonist Jeremy Udden and accordionist Michael Ward-Bergeman performed solo pieces. The music was edited by Jeremy Flower and additional compositions were provided by Flower, Baptista, Haddad along with Coppola and his mother Italia Coppola.

== Release ==
The score was released by Milan Records day-and-date with the film on September 27, 2024.

== Reception ==
Ty Burr of The Washington Post wrote "Osvaldo Golijov's score is old-school orchestral movie music with strange sunbeams shining through it." Lindsey Bahr of the Associated Press described it as a "sweeping, romantic score". Lou Thomas of NME wrote "Osvaldo Golijov's jazzy score is also a high point." Fred Hawson of ABS-CBN wrote "The rich and vibrant aural backdrop was provided by musical scorer Osvaldo Golijov." Peter Debryge of Variety and David Rooney of The Hollywood Reporter called the music to be one of the positive aspects of the film.

== Track listing ==
Megalopolis (Original Motion Picture Soundtrack) track listing
No.	Title	Artist(s)	Length
1.	"New Rome"		6:02
2.	"The Map of Utopia"		5:29
3.	"The Catilinarian Conspiracies"		3:05
4.	"Suor Angelica: Senza mamma, o bimbo, tu sei morto"	Renata Scotto	1:14
5.	"Noir Love"		4:34
6.	"Kiss in the Heights"		2:02
7.	"Saturnalia: The Unveiling of Megalopolis"		4:47
8.	"Sunny Descends"		1:26
9.	"My Pledge"	Vesta Sweetwater	3:53
10.	"Rope"		2:24
11.	"Entrance of the Gladiators"	Julius Fučík	0:53
12.	"Breathing Statues"	Jeremy Flower	3:11
13.	"Sunny's Room"		2:33
14.	"Time Shall Have No Dominion"	Osvaldo Golijov; Flower	2:39
15.	"Cesar Descends"	Cyro Baptista; Flower; Golijov; Jamey Haddad; Jeremy Udden; Michael Ward-Bergeman	6:05
16.	"Cesar Crosses the Styx"	Franz Liszt	4:07
17.	"No Turning Around"	Sweetwater	3:09
18.	"Julia Sees the Future"		1:56
19.	"The Wedding of Wow and Crassus"		2:14
20.	"Catwalk"	Golijov; Baptista; Haddad; Flower	2:38
21.	"Nush the Fixer"	Flower; Golijov; Baptista; Haddad; Ward-Bergeman	1:51
22.	"In the Bathhouse"	Flower	1:52
23.	"Megalon Team"		1:13
24.	"Mother"		1:42
25.	"Julia Comes Home"		1:08
26.	"The Golden Aleph"		0:46
27.	"The Poison Letter"		1:14
28.	"Cicero Versus Cesar"		1:04
29.	"Insurrection"	Flower; Golijov	1:49
30.	"Learning, Creating, Perfecting, Celebrating"	Flower; Golijov	0:57
31.	"The Turn of the Seasons"		1:21
32.	"Esperanza"		2:56
Total length:			82:14

== Personnel ==
Credits adapted from Film Music Reporter:

- Music composer and producer: Osvaldo Golijov
- Additional music: Jeremy Flower, Cyro Baptista, Jamey Haddad, Italia Coppola and Francis Ford Coppola
- Orchestra: Budapest Art Orchestra
- Conductor: Arturo Rodriguez
- Orchestrators: Osvaldo Golijov, Arturo Rodriguez, Kris Kukul
- Session producer: Miklos Lukacs
- Hyper accordion: Michael Ward-Bergeman
- Percussion: Cyro Baptista, Jamey Haddad
- Trumpet and flugelhorn: Dan Brantigan
- Saxophone: Jeremy Udden
- Piano and organ: Stephen Prutsman
- Music supervision: Kris Kukul
- Music editor: Jeremy Flower
- Score recorded at: East Connection Music Recording, Studio 22
- Digital recordist: David Lukacs
- Recording and mixing engineer: Gabor Buczko
- Recording assistant: Peter Pejtsik
- Librarian: Arthur Valentin Grosz
- Music preparation: Tomàs Peire-Serrate
