= Mengistu (name) =

Mengistu (Amharic: መንግስቱ) is a male given name and a patronymic surname of Ethiopian origin that may refer to:

Given name

- Mengistu Haile Mariam (born 1937), Ethiopian President and Chairman of the Derg
- Mengistu Worku (1940–2010), Ethiopian football player and coach
- Mengistu Neway (1919–1961), Ethiopian commander of the Imperial Bodyguard
- Mengistu Lemma (1924–1988), Ethiopian playwright and poet.

Surname

- Avera Mengistu (born 1986), Ethiopian-Israeli abductee
- Meseret Mengistu (born 1990), Ethiopian long-distance runner
- Shewalul Mengistu (1944–1977), Ethiopian poet, songwriter, journalist and political activist
- Tigist Mengistu (born 2000), Ethiopian Paralympic athlete
