= More Beautiful than Death =

Studio album by Either/Orchestra
- Released: 2000
- Recorded: May 30, 1998 - August 6, 1999
- Studios: Fort Apache Studios, Cambridge, MA
- Genre: Jazz
- Length: 1:13:56
- Label: Accurate (AC-3282)
- Producer: Russ Gershon

Either/Orchestra chronology
Across the Omniverse (1996)	More Beautiful than Death (2000)	Afro-Cubism (2002)

More Beautiful than Death is an album by the Either/Orchestra recorded in 1998 and 1999 and released by the Accurate Records label in 2000.

== Track listing ==
1. "Amlak Abet Abet" (Tèshomè Sissay) – 10:01
2. "Number Three" (Russ Gershon) – 10:22
3. "More Beautiful Than Death" (Russ Gershon) – 10:44
4. "Muziqawi Silt" (Girma Béyéné) – 6:21
5. “Breaktime for Dougo” (Russ Gershon) – 8:37
6. "All Those S.O.B.’s” (Russ Gershon) – 8:56
7. "Slow Mambo for J.J." (Russ Gershon) – 4:53
8. "Feqer Aydelem Wey” (Ayalew Mesfin)– 7:08
9. "The Eighth Wonder" (Russ Gershon) – 6:54

== Personnel ==
- Russ Gershon – tenor saxophone, soprano saxophone, flute, arranger
- Colin Fisher – trumpet, flugelhorn
- Tom Halter – trumpet, flugelhorn
- Joel Yennoir – trombone
- Miguel Zenón – alto saxophone
- Charlie Kohlhase – baritone saxophone
- Vicente Lebron – congas, bongos, percussion
- Atemu Aton – bass
- Rick McLaughlin – bass
- Harvey Whirt– drums
- Jaleel Shaw – alto saxophone
- Matthew Ellard – engineer
