= The Brunt =

Studio album by Either/Orchestra
- Released: 1994
- Recorded: April 22, 1993 - May 11, 1993
- Studio: The Outpost, Stoughton, MA
- Genre: Jazz
- Length: 1:04:55
- Label: Accurate (AC-3262)
- Producer: Russ Gershon

Either/Orchestra chronology
The Calculus of Pleasure (1992)	The Brunt (1994)	Across the Omniverse (1996)

The Brunt is an album by the Either/Orchestra recorded in 1993, and released by the Accurate Records label in 1994.

== Track listing ==
1. Pas de Trois (Russ Gershon) – 7:17
2. Notes on a Cliff (Curtis Hasselbring) – 6:23
3. Hard Talk (Mal Waldron) – 9:31
4. Permit Blues (Dan Fox) – 5:46
5. Jon's Dream (Bob Nieske) – 8:54
6. H.A.C. (Russ Gershon) – 7:58
7. The Brunt (Curtis Hasselbring) – 14:51
8. Blues for New Orleans (Duke Ellington) – 7:31
9. Lay Lady Lay (Bob Dylan) – 3:47

== Personnel ==
- Russ Gershon – tenor saxophone, soprano saxophone
- Tom Halter – trumpet, flugelhorn
- John Carlson – trumpet, flugelhorn, pocket trumpet
- Dan Fox – trombone
- Russell Jewell – trombone
- Andrew D'Angelo – Clarinet, bass clarinet, alto saxophone
- Charlie Kohlhase – alto saxophone, baritone saxophone
- Chris Taylor – piano, synthesizer
- John Turner – bass
- Matt Wilson – drums
