= Josh Roseman =

American jazz musician (born 1967)

Josh Roseman (born 5 June 1967) is an American jazz trombonist. His nickname is "Mr. Bone". He studied in Newton North High School.

Roseman was born in Boston, and studied at the New England Conservatory of Music. Roseman toured Jamaica with The Skatalites and in Australia with the Christopher Hale Ensemble. He has also played with Steve Coleman, Dave Holland, Dave Douglas, Don Byron, John Zorn, Charlie Hunter, Mike Gordon, Soulive, Groove Collective, and Me'Shell Ndegeocello.

Roseman has led sessions for Enja Records as The Josh Roseman Unit. His sidemen include Peter Apfelbaum, Barney McAll, Ben Monder, Jonathan Maron, Billy Kilson, Ted Poor, Tony Barba, and Kirk Knuffke and special guests on the albums include Chris Potter, Liberty Ellman, Ben Perowsky, and Mark Feldman.

== Discography ==
=== As leader ===
- Cherry (Enja, 2000)
- Treats for the Nightwalker (Enja, 2003)
- New Constellations (Accurate, 2007)

=== As sideman ===
With Brooklyn Funk Essentials

- Cool and Steady and Easy (Dorado, 1994)
- In the BuzzBag (Doublemoon, 1998)
- Make Them Like It (PIAS, 2000)

With Uri Caine

- Toys (JMT, 1995)
- Urlicht / Primal Light (Winter & Winter, 1997)
- The Sidewalks of New York: Tin Pan Alley (Winter & Winter, 1999)
- The Goldberg Variations (Winter & Winter, 2000)

With Dave Douglas

- In Our Lifetime (New World, 1995)
- Sanctuary (Avant, 1997)
- Stargazer (Arabesque, 1997)
- Soul on Soul (RCA Victor, 2000)
- Witness (Bluebird, 2001)
- Pathways (Greenleaf Music, 2013)

With Groove Collective

- Groove Collective (Reprise, 1994)
- Nerd (Reprise, 1994)
- We the People (Giant Step, 1996)
- Dance of the Drunken Master (Shanachie, 1998)
- Declassified (Shanachie, 1999)

With The Roots

- Do You Want More?!!!??! (DGC, 1994)
- From the Ground Up (Talkin' Loud, 1994)
- Illadelph Halflife (DGC, 1996)

With Ken Schaphorst

- Making Lunch (Accurate, 1989)
- After Blue (Accurate, 1991)
- Purple (Naxos, 1998)

With others

- Pheeroan Aklaff, Global Mantras (ModernMasters 1998)
- Peter Apfelbaum, It Is Written (ACT, 2005)
- Ron Blake, Sonic Tonic (Mack Avenue, 2005)
- Bojan Z, Humus (EmArcy, 2009)
- Stefano Bollani, Sheik Yer Zappa (Decca, 2014)
- Bop City, Hip Strut (Hip Bop, 1996)
- Lester Bowie, When the Spirit Returns (Dreyfus, 2003)
- Don Byron, Don Byron Plays the Music of Mickey Katz (Nonesuch, 1993)
- Don Byron, You Are #6 (Blue Note, 2001)
- Vinicius Cantuaria, Tucuma (Verve, 1998)
- Mike Clark, Conjunction (Buckyball, 2001)
- Steve Coleman, The Tao of Mad Phat (Novus, 1993)
- Defunkt, Live in Europe (Music Avenue, 2002)
- Dogzilla, Allizgod (Invisible, 1989)
- Dusty Trails, Dusty Trails (Atlantic, 2000)
- John Ellis, MOBRO (Parade Light, 2014)
- John Escreet, Sabotage and Celebration (Whirlwind, 2013)
- Either/Orchestra, Across the Omniverse (Accurate, 1996)
- Either/Orchestra, Dial "E" (Accurate, 1986)
- Laïka Fatien, Nebula (Verve, 2011)
- Majek Fashek, So Long Too Long (Sony, 1991)
- Majek Fashek, Spirit of Love (Interscope, 1991)
- Mitchell Froom, Dopamine (Atlantic, 1998)
- John Gordon, Live in Concert (Mons, 1993)
- Dave Holland, What Goes Around (ECM, 2002)
- Dave Holland, Overtime (Dare2, 2004)
- Charlie Hunter, Charlie Hunter (Blue Note, 2000)
- Yoko Kanno, Cowboy Bebop: Tank! the! Best! (Victor, 2004)
- Oliver Lake, Otherside (Gramavision, 1988)
- Oliver Lake, Cloth (Passin' Thru, 2003)
- Sean Lennon, Into the Sun (Grand Royal, 1998)
- Sean Lennon, Half Horse Half Musician (Grand Royal, 1999)
- Arto Lindsay, Noon Chill (Bar/None, 1998)
- Cibo Matto, Viva! La Woman (Warner Bros., 1996)
- Cibo Matto, Stereo Type A (Warner Bros., 1999)
- Barney McAll, Widening Circles (Aija, 1998)
- Barney Mcall, Mother of Dreams and Secrets (Research, 2018)
- Medeski Martin & Wood, It's a Jungle in Here (Gramavision, 1993)
- Anais Mitchell, Hadestown (Righteous Babe, 2010)
- Jason Moran, All Rise: A Joyful Elegy for Fats Waller (Blue Note, 2014)
- Meshell Ndegeocello, The Spirit Music Jamia (Universal/EmArcy, 2005)
- Jeb Loy Nichols, Lovers Knot (Capitol, 1997)
- No Trend, More (Morphius, 2001)
- Papa Dee, Original Master (Telegram Stockholm 1994)
- Ned Rothenberg, Power Lines (New World, 1995)
- Roswell Rudd, Broad Strokes (Knitting Factory, 2000)
- Roswell Rudd, Trombone Tribe (Sunnyside, 2009)
- Seatbelts, Cowboy Bebop: No Disc (Victor, 1998)
- Seatbelts, Cowboy Bebop: Vitaminless (Victor, 1998)
- Ron Sexsmith, Other Songs (Interscope, 1997)
- SFJAZZ Collective, Inaugural Season Live 2004 (SFJAZZ, 2004)
- SFJAZZ Collective, SFJazz Collective (Nonesuch, 2005)
- Sheryl Crow, Sheryl Crow (A&M, 1996)
- Shinji Takeda, Abstract Jazz Lounge (Nite Grooves, 1996)
- Towa Tei, Sound Museum (Elektra, 1997)
- Bill Ware, Long and Skinny (Knitting Factory, 1993)
- John Zorn, Cobra: John Zorn's Game Pieces Volume 2 (Tzadik, 2002)
