= Sonero: The Music of Ismael Rivera =

Studio album by Miguel Zenón
- Released: 2019
- Recorded: March 19–20, 2019
- Studio: Power Station (Waterford, Connecticut)
- Genre: Latin jazz
- Label: Miel

Miguel Zenón chronology
Yo Soy La Tradición (2018)	Sonero: The Music of Ismael Rivera (2019)	El Arte Del Bolero (2021)

Sonero: The Music of Ismael Rivera is an album by Miguel Zenón. It received a Grammy Award nomination for Best Latin Jazz Album and also a Latin Grammy Award nomination for Best Latin Jazz/Jazz Album.
