= Mood Music for Time Travellers =

Studio album by Either/Orchestra
- Released: August 10, 2010
- Studios: Q Division, Somerville, Massachusetts and Wellspring Sound, Acton, Massachusetts
- Genre: Jazz
- Length: 1:16:55
- Label: Accurate (AC-3285)
- Producer: Russ Gershon

Either/Orchestra chronology
Ethiopiques Vol. 20: Live in Addis (2005)	Mood Music for Time Travellers (2010)	Ethiopiques Vol. 32: Nalbandian the Ethiopian (2025)

Mood Music for Time Travellers is an album by the Either/Orchestra released by the Accurate Records label in 2010.

== Track listing ==
1. "The (One of a Kind) Shimmy" (Russ Gershon) – 5:37
2. "Beaucoups Kookoo" (Russ Gershon) – 6:16
3. "Coolocity" (Russ Gershon) –6:02
4. "Portrait of Lindsey Schust" (Russ Gershon) – 9:42
5. "Ropa Loca" (Russ Gershon) –6:27
6. "Thirty Five" (Rick McLaughlin) – 8:24
7. "Latin Dimensions" (Joel Yennior) – 4:50
8. "The Petrograd Revision" (Russ Gershon) – 7:18
9. "Suriname" (Joel Yennior) – 10:01
10. "History Lesson" (Rick McLaughlin) – 11:55

== Personnel ==
- Russ Gershon – tenor saxophone, soprano saxophone
- Daniel Rosenthal – trumpet
- Tom Halter – trumpet
- Joel Yennoir – trombone
- Godwin Louis – alto saxophone
- Henry Cook – flute
- Charlie Kohlhase – baritone saxophone
- Kurtis Rivers – baritone saxophone
- Vicente Lebron – bongos, congas, percussion
- Rafael Alcalá – piano, Hammond B3 organ
- Rick McLaughlin – double bass, electric bass
- Pablo Bencid – drums
