= The Calculus of Pleasure =

Studio album by Either/Orchestra
- Released: 1992
- Recorded: April 25, 1990 - June 27, 1990
- Studio: The Outpost, Stoughton, MA and Roxy's Downtown-Big Dog Studios, Wichita, KS
- Genre: Jazz
- Length: 1:14:09
- Label: Accurate; AC-3252
- Producer: Russ Gershon

Either/Orchestra chronology
The Half-Life of Desire (1990)	The Calculus of Pleasure (1992)	The Brunt (1994)

The Calculus of Pleasure is an album by the Either/Orchestra recorded in 1990, and released by the Accurate Records label in 1992. Russ Gershon was nominated for a Grammy Award for Best Arrangement on an Instrumental Composition for the second track on this album, Bennie Moten’s Weird Nightmare.

== Track listing ==
1. Whisper Not (Benny Golson) – 9:09
2. Bennie Moten’s Weird Nightmare (Russ Gershon) – 8:09
3. Consenting Adults (Bob Nieske) – 9:42
4. Ecaroh (Horace Silver) – 6:52
5. Unnatural Pastime (Curtis Hasselbring) – 4:46
6. The Hard Blues (Julius Hemphill) – 13:09
7. Miles Away (Russ Gershon) – 14:51
8. Grey (Bob Nieske) – 7:31

== Personnel ==
- Russ Gershon – tenor saxophone, soprano saxophone, composer, mixing, producer
- Tom Halter – trumpet
- John Carlson – trumpet
- Curtis Hasselbring – trombone
- Russell Jewell – trombone
- Douglas Yates – alto saxophone, soprano saxophone, bass clarinet
- Charlie Kohlhase – alto saxophone, baritone saxophone
- John Medeski – piano, organ, DX7
- John Dirac – electric guitar, arranger
- Bob Nieske – bass
- Matt Wilson – drums
- Steven Falke – engineer
