= The Half-Life of Desire =

Studio album by Either/Orchestra
- Released: 1990
- Recorded: January 31, 1988 and April 29 & 30, 1989
- Studio: The Outpost, Stoughton, MA and Van Gelder Studio, Englewood Cliffs, NJ
- Genre: Jazz
- Length: 55:23
- Label: Accurate; AC-3242
- Producer: Russ Gershon

Either/Orchestra chronology
Radium (1988)	The Half-Life of Desire (1990)	The Calculus of Pleasure (1992)

The Half-Life of Desire is an album by the Either/Orchestra recorded in 1989, with one track from 1988, and released by the Accurate Records label the following year.

== Reception ==
Professional ratings
Review scores
Source	Rating
Allmusic	4/5 stars
The Penguin Guide to Jazz Recordings	3.5/4 stars

Allmusic's Brian Olewnick called it "Either/Orchestra's finest, most accomplished release" and said: "Beautifully recorded by legendary engineer Rudy van Gelder, the band is extraordinarily tight and vibrant, showing none of the muddy quality that would sully some of their later work ... Quite a journey, resulting in arguably the best of this unusual band's release. Very highly recommended".

== Track listing ==
1. "Strange Meridian" (Russ Gershon) – 8:28
2. "Premonitions" (Curtis Hasselbring) – 5:29
3. "The Half-Life of Desire" (Gershon) – 5:30
4. "He Who Hesitates" (Hasselbring) – 7:54
5. "Temptation" (Nacio Herb Brown, Arthur Freed) – 5:17
6. "Circle in the Round/I Got It Bad" (Miles Davis/Duke Ellington) – 11:18
7. "Red" (Robert Fripp) – 11:21

== Personnel ==
- Russ Gershon – tenor saxophone, soprano saxophone, flute, arranger
- John Carlson, Tom Halter – trumpet, flugelhorn
- Curtis Hasselbring, Russell Jewell – trombone
- Douglas Yates – alto saxophone, soprano saxophone
- Charlie Kohlhase – alto saxophone, baritone saxophone
- John Medeski – piano, organ, DX7
- John Dirac – electric guitar, arranger
- Mike Rivard – bass
- Jerome Deupree – drums
- Mark Sandman – vocals, guitar, arranger (track 5)
- Robb Rawlings – alto saxophone (track 5)
- Dave Finucane – bass clarinet (track 5)
- Kenny Freundlich – piano, synthesizer (track 5)
