= Yo Soy La Tradición =

Studio album by Miguel Zenón
- Released: 2018
- Genre: Jazz

Miguel Zenón chronology
Típico (2017)	Yo Soy La Tradición (2018)	Sonero: The Music of Ismael Rivera (2019)

Yo Soy La Tradición is an album by Miguel Zenón, released in 2018. The album was recorded with Spektral Quartet and features jazz interpretations of folklore and traditional music from Zenón's native Puerto Rico. The second track "Cadenas" was nominated for a Grammy Award for Best Improvised Jazz Solo in 2019.

== Track listing ==
All songs written by Miguel Zenón.

No.	Title	Length
1.	"Rosario"	7:19
2.	"Cadenas"	7:15
3.	"Yumac"	5:56
4.	"Milagrosa"	6:58
5.	"Viejo"	8:41
6.	"Cadenza"	8:57
7.	"Promesa"	9:40
8.	"Villalbeño"	7:07
Total length:		61:53
