= Dial "E" =

Studio album by Either/Orchestra
- Released: 1987
- Recorded: July 8 and 9, 1986
- Studios: Audio-Matrix Studios, Cambridge, MA and Ryles Jazz Club, Cambridge, Massachusetts
- Genre: Jazz
- Length: 46:17
- Label: Accurate (AC-2222)
- Producer: Russ Gershon

Either/Orchestra chronology
Dial "E" (1987)	Radium (1988)

Dial "E" is the first album by the Either/Orchestra recorded in 1986 and released by the Accurate Records label in 1987.

== Track listing ==
1. Doxy (Sonny Rollins) – 5:14
2. Nicole is Always in Tokyo (Russ Gershon) – 10:07
3. Brilliant Corners (Thelonious Monk) – 5:17
4. 17 December (Russ Gershon) – 19:42
5. Lady’s Blues (Rahsaan Roland Kirk) – 6:28

== Personnel ==
- Russ Gershon – tenor saxophone
- Tom Halter – trumpet
- Dave Ballou – trumpet
- Robb Rawlings – alto saxophone
- Steve Norton – baritone saxophone
- Josh Roseman – trombone
- Russell Jewell – trombone
- John Dirac – electric guitar
- Mike Rivard – bass
- Jerome Deupree – drums
- Kenny Freundlich – piano, synthesizer
- Bob Seely – trumpet (Nicole is Always in Tokyo and Lady’s Blues)
- Dan Drexler – trumpet (Nicole is Always in Tokyo and Lady’s Blues)
- Bob Sinfonia – alto saxophone (Lady’s Blues)
- Copley Cats – vocals (17 December)
