= Across the Omniverse =

Studio album by Either/Orchestra
- Released: 1996
- Recorded: July 8, 1986 - September 7, 1995
- Studio: Various
- Genre: Jazz
- Length: 2:22:19
- Label: Accurate; AC-3272
- Producer: Russ Gershon

Either/Orchestra chronology
The Brunt (1994)	Across the Omniverse (1996)	More Beautiful than Death (2000)

Across the Omniverse is an album by the Either/Orchestra of previously unreleased tracks recorded over the first ten years of the band’s existence. The album was released by the Accurate Records label in 1996.

== Track listing ==
1. The Jeep is Jumpin’ (Duke Ellington/Johnny Hodges) – 3:52
2. Theme from the E-Men (Russ Gershon) – 6:29
3. No Negative Energy (Intro) (Billy Skinner) – 2:17
4. No Negative Energy (Billy Skinner) – 5:37
5. Doghouse Interior (Curtis Hasselbring) – 12:38
6. In a Sentimental Mood (Duke Ellington/ Manny Kurtz/Irving Mills) – 4:01
7. Big Butt (Andrew D'Angelo) – 3:58
8. The Look of Love (Burt Bacharach/Hal David) – 7:18
9. Night of the Living Blues (Russell Jewell) – 7:49
10. Swamiji’s Mood (John Tchicai) – 3:35
11. Born in a Suitcase (Russ Gershon) – 16:17
12. Notes on a Cliff (Curtis Hasselbring) – 6:23
13. The New Llama Walk (Charlie Kohlhase) – 4:31
14. Caravan (Duke Ellington/Irving Mills/Juan Tizol) – 5:19
15. Timon of Athens (Duke Ellington) – 2:05
16. Blue Lights (Gigi Gryce) – 6:30
17. There’s a Bus That’s Leaving Soon for Alban Berg’s House (Bob Nieske) – 5:10
18. Coltrane in Paradise (Sonny Simmons) – 8:19
19. The Door (Curtis Hasselbring) – 8:59
20. Pendulum (Richie Beirach) – 8:29
21. I Want You (She’s So Heavy) (John Lennon/Paul McCartney) – 8:06
22. Ballad for Sun Ra (Russ Gershon) – 5:00
23. Jump (Bob Nieske) – 6:00

== Personnel ==
- Russ Gershon – arranger, cover design, producer, soprano saxophone, tenor saxophone
- Allan Chase – alto saxophone
- Andrew D'Angelo – alto saxophone, clarinet
- Charlie Kohlhase – alto saxophone, baritone saxophone
- Dana Colley – baritone saxophone
- Doug Yates – alto saxophone, clarinet
- Henry Cook – alto saxophone
- Jay Brandford – alto saxophone
- John Tchicai – bass clarinet, alto saxophone, tenor saxophone
- Oscar Noriega – alto saxophone, calrinet
- Phil Scarff – alto saxophone
- Robb Rawlings – clarinet, alto saxophone, arranger
- Steve Adams – alto saxophone
- Steve Norton – alto Saxophone, baritone saxophone
- Tom Halter – flugelhorn, trumpet
- Dave Ballou – trumpet
- John Carlson – flugelhorn, trumpet
- Matt Simon – trumpet
- Steve Forey – trumpet
- Tommy Lindsay – trumpet
- Curtis Hasselbring – trombone
- Dan Fox – trombone
- Dave Shrake – trombone
- Josh Roseman – trombone
- Kazu – trombone
- Robert Hudson – trombone
- Russell Jewell – trombone
- Tom Whaley – trombone
- Mark McGrain – trombone
- Chris Taylor – piano, synthesizer
- David Phillip – piano
- Kenny Freundlich – DX-7, piano, synthesizer
- John Medeski – organ, organ (Hammond), piano
- Frank Carlberg – piano
- Ted Pine – piano
- Tim Ray – piano
- Michael Shea – piano
- Jeff Friedman – guitar
- Jerry Hahn – guitar
- John Dirac – guitar, arranger
- Mark Sandman – guitar, vocals, arranger
- Mitch Haupers – guitar
- Morris Acevedo – guitar
- Steve Grismore – guitar
- Judy Kuhn – vocals
- Dominique Eade – vocals
- Tony Scherr – bass
- Paul Bryan – bass
- John Turner – bass
- David Poyourow – bass
- Chris Wood – bass
- Bob Nieske – bass
- Michael Rivard – acoustic bass, electric bass, arranger
- Matt Wilson – drums
- Jerome Deupree – drums
- Jamie Moore – drums
- Eric Rosenthal – drums
- Ben Wittman – drums
- Bobby Ward – drums
- Nii Narku – percussion

== Production ==
- Roger Stevenson – engineer
- Rudy Van Gelder – engineer
- Paul Q. Kolderie – Mixing
- Peter Kontrimas – engineer
- Michael Merril – engineer, mixing
- Laurie Flannery – editing, mastering
- Jim Siegel – engineer, mixing
- Jim Anderson – mixing
- George B. Hicks – engineer, producer
- David Lefkowitz – mixing
- Steve Falke – engineer
- Bill Crabtree – digital editing
