= Dave Ballou =

American jazz trumpeter

Dave Ballou is an American jazz trumpeter and professor of music at Towson University, in Maryland.

== Early life and education ==
Ballou was born in Peace Dale, Rhode Island. He started playing the trumpet at age 11.

Ballou received his bachelor's degree at Berklee College of Music in 1986 and his master's degree at the University of New Hampshire in 1992.

== Career ==
He played in the Mingus Epitaph band and has worked as a sideman for musicians such as Rabih Abou-Khalil, Andy Biskin, Michael Formanek, Satoko Fujii, Jacob Garchik, Andrew Hill, John Hollenbeck, Sheila Jordan, Oliver Lake, Dave Liebman, Joe Lovano, Denman Maroney, Orange Then Blue, Tom Rainey, Maria Schneider, Michael Jefry Stevens, and Nate Wooley. His first album as a leader was issued in 1998.

Ballou is currently professor of music at Towson University in Maryland.

== Discography ==
=== Albums ===
- Amongst Ourselves (Steeplechase, 1998)
- Volition (Steeplechase, 1999)
- The Floating World (Steeplechase, 2000)
- On This Day (Steeplechase, 2001)
- Rothko (Steeplechase, 2002)
- Dancing Foot (Steeplechase, 2004)
- Regards (Steeplechase, 2005)
- Insistence (Steeplechase, 2007)
- Solo Trumpet (Clean Feed, 2015)
- Dave Ballou & BeepHonk - The Windup (Clean Feed, 2018)

With Mark Murphy

- Some Time Ago (HighNote, 2000)
- Links (HighNote, 2001)

With Rabih Abou-Khalil

- The Cactus of Knowledge (Enja, 2001)

With Samo Salamon

- Dream Suites Vol. 1 (Samo Records, 2025)

With Either/Orchestra

- Dial "E" (Accurate, 1987)
- Across the Omniverse (Accurate, 1996)
