= Either/Orchestra =

American jazz band

- Origin: Cambridge, Massachusetts, United States
- Genres: Jazz; Latin; Ethiopian; avant-garde jazz
- Years active: 1985–present
- Labels: Accurate Records, Buda Musique
- Past members: John Medeski, Josh Roseman, Matt Wilson, Miguel Zenón, Jaleel Shaw, Curtis Hasselbring, John Carlson, Andrew D'Angelo, Jerome Deupree, Michael Rivard

The Either/Orchestra (E/O) is a jazz group formed by Russ Gershon in Cambridge, Massachusetts, US, in 1985. E/O is configured as a "small big band", with three saxes, two trumpets and one or two trombones. E/O's is characterized by a heavier and more orchestrated sound than that of a smaller jazz combo, but remains more streamlined and improvisation-oriented than most big bands.

== History and style ==
Drawing on leader Gershon's experience on the Boston rock scene coupled with the diverse musical backgrounds of its members, the outlines of the Either/Orchestra were influenced by Duke Ellington, Gil Evans, Charles Mingus, and Sun Ra. The group also makes significant references to pop and rock, and along the full range of jazz styles ranging from early jazz through the avant-garde. This broad collection of influences is reflected by the (non-original) compositions recorded by the band over the years: Doxy (Sonny Rollins), Brilliant Corners, Nutty (Thelonious Monk), Lady's Blues (Rahsaan Roland Kirk), Odwallah (Roscoe Mitchell), Willow Weep for Me (Ann Ronell), Circle in the Round (Miles Davis), I Got it Bad , In a Sentimental Mood , Timon of Athens (Ellington), Red (Robert Fripp), Ode to Billie Joe (Bobbie Gentry), Lay Lady Lay (Bob Dylan), and I Want You/She's So Heavy (Lennon–McCartney). The group's repertoire has also included original compositions by Gershon, Bob Nieske, Curtis Hasselbring and others.

In the AllMusic Guide, Dave Lynch writes that the E/O performs

"engagingly idiosyncratic large-ensemble jazz while serving as a formative workshop for musicians who have received significant popular and critical recognition in their post-E/O careers... [the] Either/Orchestra revels in delivering the unexpected and is forever throwing curves at the listener. While deftly mixing idioms, E/O consistently meets the expectations of the best large-ensemble jazz; the band's members solo with both passion and skill, navigate complex charts, and swing with abandon."

== Live performances ==
The Cambridge Public Library was the location of the first E/O concert, on December 17, 1985. The group began playing regularly around the Boston area, and then distinguished itself from most other American jazz ensembles by emulating indie rock bands and making a number of lengthy van tours around the US and Canada in the late 1980s and early 1990s, playing many "non-jazz" venues. Band member (1988–1990) John Medeski, who later co-founded Medeski Martin & Wood, has cited this experience as a model for the latter band's grassroots barnstorming. Leader Gershon planned this strategy in an effort to re-create the working conditions of the earlier jazz big bands, feeling that this was the best way to achieve an organic and contemporary sound with a large group, and to hone the music by playing for a variety of audiences. In recent years, the group has toured more selectively, performing in the Netherlands, Finland, Sweden, Russia, Italy, Portugal, Ethiopia and Uganda. It has been estimated that the Either/Orchestra has performed more than 1,000 concerts.

== Band members ==
Due to the size and longevity of the group, even with an average tenure of over four years there have been close to fifty band members. Only Gershon and trumpeter Tom Halter have remained throughout. Early members included Jerome Deupree, Michael Rivard, Dave Ballou, Josh Roseman, Russell Jewell, Robb Rawlings, Steve Norton, Kenny Freundlich and John Dirac. Middle-period members include John Medeski, Matt Wilson, Charlie Kohlhase, Curtis Hasselbring, Andrew D'Angelo, Douglas Yates, John Carlson, Dave Shrake, Dan Fox, and Bob Nieske. Later members included Miguel Zenón, Jaleel Shaw, Dan Kaufman, Greg Burk, Colin Fisher, Rick McLaughlin, Surinamese drummer Harvey Wirht and Vicente Lebron, a Dominican conguero whose presence strengthened the Latin influence in the group's sound. The band has collaborated with singers Mark Sandman and Judy Kuhn, and saxophonist/composer John Tchicai, along with a number of Ethiopian musicians, including Mulatu Astatke and singer Hana Shenkute.

== Ethiopian music ==
The E/O began performing original arrangements of Ethiopian songs, inspired by a compilation called Ethiopian Groove: the Golden 70s. In 2000, after three of these songs appeared on the album More Beautiful than Death, Francis Falceto, the producer of Ethiopian Groove, contacted Gershon and eventually arranged an invitation for the E/O to play at the Ethiopian Music Festival in Addis Ababa in 2004. Along with Indo-British singer Susheela Raman the same year, the E/O was the first non-Ethiopian artist to appear in the festival, and was the first US big band to appear in Ethiopia since Duke Ellington's in 1973. Their concert at the festival was recorded and ultimately appeared in Falceto's Éthiopiques series on the French Buda Musique label. Five Ethiopian guests appear on the recording: Mulatu Astatke, Getatchew Mekurya, Tsedenia Markos, Bahta Hewet and Michael Belayneh. This tour and recording have led to an ongoing collaboration with Astatke, the primary founder of Ethiopian jazz, concerts with Ethiopian expatriates singer Hana Shenkute, krar player Minale Dagnew, masinko player Setegn Atanaw, and the great Ethiopian singer Mahmoud Ahmed, with whom E/O released a DVD in 2007. Mahmoud Ahmed and fellow legendary Ethiopian singer Alemayehu Eshete played Lincoln Center Out of Doors in 2008 backed by E/O. The group debuted a collaboration with vocalist Teshome Mitiku in the summer of 2010, including a headlining appearance at the Chicago Jazz Festival.

== Discography ==
- Dial "E" (Accurate, 1987)
- Radium (Accurate, 1988)
- The Half-Life of Desire (Accurate, 1990)
- The Calculus of Pleasure (Accurate, 1992)
- The Brunt (Accurate, 1994)
- Across the Omniverse (Accurate, 1996)
- More Beautiful than Death (Accurate, 2000)
- Afro-Cubism (Accurate, 2002)
- Neo-Modernism (Accurate, 2004)
- Ethiopiques Vol. 20: Live in Addis (Buda Musique, 2005)
- Mood Music for Time Travellers (Accurate, 2010)
- Ethiopiques Vol. 32: Nalbandian the Ethiopian (Buda Musique, 2025)
