= Miguel Zenón =

Puerto Rican alto saxophonist

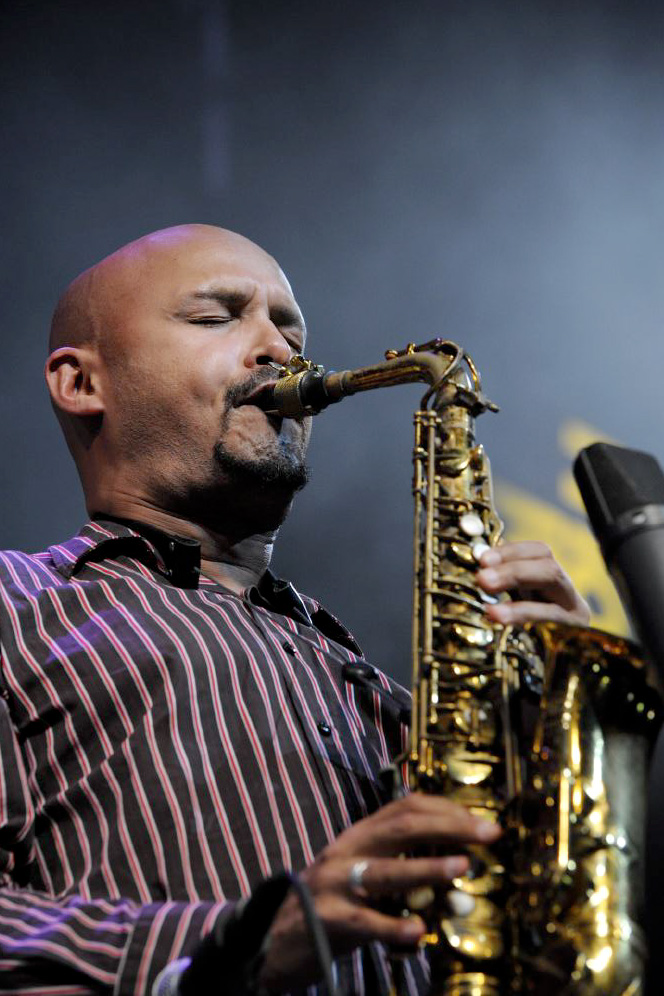
- Zenón performing at the 2009 Moers Festival

Background information
- Born: December 30, 1976 (age 49); San Juan, Puerto Rico
- Genres: Jazz, Plena
- Occupation: Musician
- Instrument: Alto saxophone
- Years active: 2000s–present
- Labels: Miel Music, Marsalis Music
- Member of: Miguel Zenón Quartet, SFJAZZ Collective
- Website: www.miguelzenon.com

Miguel Zenón (born December 30, 1976) is a Puerto Rican alto saxophonist, composer, band leader, music producer, and educator. He is a Grammy Award winner, the recipient of a Guggenheim Fellowship, a MacArthur Fellowship, and a Doris Duke Artist Award. He also holds an Honorary Doctorate Degree in the Arts from Universidad del Sagrado Corazón. Zenón has released many albums as a band leader and appeared on over 100 recordings as a sideman.

== Early life ==
Born in San Juan, Puerto Rico, Zenón was raised in Residencial Luis Lloréns Torres, the largest housing project in the Island. Although he didn't grow up in a family of musicians, he was nevertheless exposed to various styles of music from a very early age. At age 10 he received his first lessons on music theory and solfeggio from Ernesto Vigoreaux, an elderly gentleman who traveled from the adjacent neighborhood of Villa Palmeras to Llorens Torres every day in order to work with disadvantaged youth in the community. Zenón would eventually be admitted to Escuela Libre de Música, a performing arts middle school and high school where he was trained for six years on classical saxophone by Angel Marrero. On the 11th grade he was exposed to jazz music by some of his friends at the school and became very interested in the concept of improvisation and on the music of jazz saxophonist Charlie Parker. Although he had always shown interest in the natural sciences, he declined an engineering scholarship from the Recinto Universitario de Mayagüez (the foremost engineering institution in the Island) and decided to pursue a career in music. After a year and a half worth of efforts to gather enough funds in scholarships and financial aid, Zenón moved to Boston in the spring of 1996 to begin his studies at Berklee College of Music.

== Education and session work ==
At Berklee, Zenón's classmates included Antonio Sánchez, Anat Cohen, Avishai Cohen, Jaleel Shaw, and Jeremy Pelt. During his time in Boston, he was heavily influenced by Bill Pierce, Ed Tomassi, and Hal Crook. It was also during this time that he met Panamanian pianist Danilo Pérez, who would become a mentor and collaborator. After graduating from Berklee in 1996, Zenón attended Manhattan School of Music, where he studied with Dick Oatts, Nils Vigeland and Ludmila Ulehla and received a master's degree in Performance in 2001 before settling in New York City. As a sideman, he has worked with SFJAZZ Collective, Charlie Haden, Fred Hersch, Kenny Werner, Guillermo Klein & Los Guachos, David Sánchez, Danilo Pérez, The Vanguard Jazz Orchestra, Kurt Elling, The Mingus Big Band, Ray Barreto, Jerry González & The Fort Apache Band, Jeff Ballard Trio, Miles Okazaki, Dan Weiss, Dan Tepfer, Bobby Hutcherson, Steve Coleman, Andy Montañez, Brian Lynch, Antonio Sánchez, Joey Calderazzo and Paoli Mejías.

== As leader ==
=== The Miguel Zenón Quartet ===
In 1999 Zenón started getting together with Mexican drummer Antonio Sánchez (who he met at Berklee College of Music), Austrian bassist Hans Glawischnig (Zenón's bandmate in the David Sanchez Group) and Venezuelan pianist Luis Perdomo (a classmate of Glawischnig's at The Manhattan School of Music). They would meet for informal rehearsal sessions at Glawischnig's apartment in New York's Upper West Side and play through some of Zenón's early compositions. The group, which would eventually become the Miguel Zenón Quartet, soon started performing at various venues in the city, such as the C Note and The Jazz Gallery. In 2005 Sanchez began working regularly with The Pat Metheny Group, and was replaced in the Quartet by Puerto Rican drummer Henry Cole, for what has become the longest running version of the ensemble.

=== Recordings as leader ===
- Looking Forward (Fresh Sound New Talent, 2002): Recommended by some of his peers, Miguel Zenón reached a deal with the Spanish record label Fresh Sound New Talent, which released his first album as a leader. The recording featured his working Quartet (with Perdomo, Glawischnig and Sanchez) and included many special guests, such as saxophonist David Sanchez, guitarist Ben Monder and percussionist Pernell Saturnino. The album was selected by the New York Times as the top "Alternative" jazz recording of 2002.
- Ceremonial (Marsalis Music, 2004): After Zenón's first release, he was approached by saxophonist Branford Marsalis (whom Zenón had met while working with David Sanchez) to join his newly formed record label Marsalis Music. Zenón was signed to a multi-record deal and released his second album as a leader with the label. The album featured the Quartet performing his original compositions plus an arrangement of the Gospel Hymn "Great is Thy Faithfulness". Ceremonial was described by All About Jazz as a "recording (that) brings not only Latin persuasions but also a refined mix of contemporary, classic, and global influences… Highly recommended".
- Jíbaro (Marsalis Music, 2005): His third recording as a leader featured original compositions inspired by elements coming from la La Música Jibara, a style of folk music from the rural areas of Puerto Rico. About Jíbaro, Jazz Times Magazine wrote: "A searing modern-jazz sound, a quartet sensibility that Zenon and his mates have spent years developing. The result is profound yet joyful, as rhythmically precise as it is lyrical and limber."
- Awake (Marsalis Music, 2008): Zenón's fourth release, and the first to incorporate Henry Cole on the drum chair, incorporates a string quartet and additional horns to Zenón's core group for and outing of original compositions.
- Esta Plena (Marsalis Music, 2009): His fifth album was inspired by Plena music from Puerto Rico, with original compositions supported by a fellowship from the John Simon Guggenheim Foundation. On it Zenón augmented his quartet to include three percussionist/vocalists and took on the additional roles of both lyricist and vocalist. Esta Plena received two Grammy nominations (Best Improvised Solo and Best Latin Jazz Album) and a Latin Grammy nomination for Best Latin Jazz Album.
- Alma Adentro (Marsalis Music, 2011): A tribute to the Puerto Rican Songbook on which Zenón arranged the music of five Puerto Rican composers: Bobby Capo, Tite Curet Alonso, Pedro Flores, Rafael Hernandez and Sylvia Rexach. The recording features his Quartet plus a ten-piece woodwind ensemble orchestrated and conducted by Guillermo Klein. Alma Adentro was chosen as the Best Jazz Recording of 2011 by iTunes and NPR, and received a Grammy nomination for Best Large Jazz Ensemble Album plus a Latin Grammy nomination for Best Instrumental Album.
- Rayuela (Sunnyside Records, 2012): A collaboration with French pianist/composer Laurent Coq, this album was inspired on the book of the same name by Argentinean writer Julio Cortazar. The recording also features Dana Leong (on cello and trombone) and Dan Weiss (on tabla, drums and percussion).
- Oye!!! Live in Puerto Rico (Miel Music, 2013): Zenón's eight recording as a leader (and first for his independent label Miel Music) features the debut recording of The Rhythm Collective, an ensemble first put together in 2003 for a month long tour of West Africa. The "all Puerto Rican" group includes Aldemar Valentín on electric bass, Tony Escapa on drums and Reinaldo de Jesus on percussion.
- Identities Are Changeable (Miel Music, 2014): Inspired by the idea of national identity as experienced by the Puerto Rican community in the United States, specifically in the New York City area. The music on the album was written around a series of interviews with several individuals, all of them New Yorkers of Puerto Rican descent. The album, which is also complemented by a video installment by David Dempewolf, features his Quartet plus a twelve-piece Big Band. Identities Are Changeable received a Grammy nomination for Best Latin Jazz Album.
- Típico (Miel Music, 2017): Celebrates the Miguel Zenón Quartet, his working band of more than 15 years. The album features original music by Zenón, which was specifically written for the members of the Quartet and directly inspired by their individual playing and personalities. Típico received a Grammy nomination and a Latin Grammy nomination for Best Latin Jazz Album.
- Yo Soy La Tradición (Miel Music, 2018): Original compositions by Zenón, inspired by various cultural and musical traditions from Puerto Rico. The music is scored for Alto Saxophone and String Quartet and features Spektral Quartet, a string ensemble based in Chicago, IL. Yo Soy La Tradición received a Grammy nomination and a Latin Grammy nomination for Best Latin Jazz Album.
- Sonero: The Music of Ismael Rivera (Miel Music, 2019): A tribute to the legendary Puerto Rican Salsa icon Ismael Rivera, with arrangements by Zenón interpreted by his Quartet. Sonero: The Music of Ismael Rivera received a Grammy nomination and a Latin Grammy nomination for Best Latin Jazz Album.
- El Arte Del Bolero (Miel Music, 2021): A duo recording with Venezuelan pianist Luis Perdomo. The album was recorded live at The Jazz Gallery in NYC during the COVID-19 Pandemic and features Boleros and other songs from the Latin American Songbook. El Arte Del Bolero received a Grammy nomination and a Latin Grammy nomination for Best Latin Jazz Album.
- Law Years: The Music Of Ornette Coleman (Miel Music, 2021): Recorded live in May 2019 at the Bird's Eye Jazz Club in Basel, Switzerland, along with saxophonist Ariel Bringuez, bassist Demian Cabaud and drummer Jordi Rossy. It features the music of saxophonist and composer Ornette Coleman.
- Música De Las Américas (Miel Music, 2022): Featuring original music by Zenón, all inspired by the history of the American continent. The album showcases his longstanding quartet of pianist Luis Perdomo, bassist Hans Glawischnig, and drummer Henry Cole, with special contributions from the Puerto Rican plena ensemble Los Pleneros de La Cresta and percussionists Paoli Mejías, Daniel Díaz and Victor Emmanuelli. Música De Las Americas received a Grammy nomination for Best Latin Jazz Album.
- El Arte Del Bolero Vol.2 (Miel Music, 2023): The follow up to their Grammy Nominated 2021 release, this album (with pianist Luis Perdomo) further explores classics from the Latin American Songbook, including compositions by Ruben Blades, Simón Diaz and Rafael Hernández Marín. El Arte Del Bolero Vol. 2 won the 2024 Grammy Award for Best Latin Jazz Album.
- Golden City (Miel Music, 2024): an extended work of original music inspired by the demographic and political evolution of the city of San Francisco, from the pre-colonial period to the contemporary tech-dominated era. The album features a nine-piece ensemble and was nominated for a Grammy under the Best Large Jazz Ensemble Album category and for a Latin Grammy under the Best Latin Jazz Album category.
- Vanguardia Subterránea: Live at The Village Vanguard (Miel Music, 2025): recorded at The Village Vanguard in New York City, the album celebrates 20 years of the Miguel Zenón Quartet. Their first live recording as an ensemble features original music by Zenón, plus arrangements of Salsa works by Willie Colón and Gilberto Santa Rosa. Vanguardia Subterránea received a Grammy nomination for Best Latin Jazz Album.

== Teaching and composing ==
Zenón has given hundreds of lectures and master classes and has taught all over the world at institutions which include: The Banff Centre, Berklee College of Music, University of North Texas, Siena Jazz, Conservatorium Van Amsterdam, Musik Akademie Basel, Conservatoire de Paris, University of Manitoba, Manhattan School of Music, MIT, Conservatory of Music of Puerto Rico, Columbia University, Princeton University, Kimmel Center for the Performing Arts, San Francisco Conservatory of Music, Universidad Veracruzana, UMass- Amherst and The Brubeck Institute. In addition he served as the 2020-2022 Jazz Artist-in-Residence at the Zuckerman Institute at Columbia University. He is currently an Associate Professor in the Music Department at the Massachusetts Institute of Technology. As a composer he has been commissioned by SFJAZZ, The New York State Council for the Arts, Chamber Music America, The John Simon Guggenheim Foundation, Hyde Park Jazz Festival, The Logan Center for the Arts, Miller Theatre, Jazz Reach, Peak Performances, PRISM Quartet, Spektral Quartet, Peak Performances, Carnegie Hall, MIT, Kinetic Ensemble and many of his peers.

== Caravana Cultural ==
In 2011 Zenón founded Caravana Cultural, an initiative that organizes free-of-charge jazz concerts in rural areas of Puerto Rico. Each concert focuses on the music of a distinguished jazz figure (Charlie Parker, Miles Davis and Duke Ellington, among others) and is preceded by a presentation that touches on the basic elements of jazz and improvisation. The concert also incorporates young musicians from the community, who join the band on the last piece of the concert. Caravana Cultural, which is funded and produced by Zenón, looks to make a "social investment" in the island using jazz as a vehicle to advocate for cultural accessibility.

== Awards and honors ==
He won the 2024 Grammy Award for Best Latin Jazz Album with his recording El Arte del Bolero, Vol. 2. He also topped both the Jazz Artist of the Year and Alto Saxophonist of the Year categories on the 2014 Jazz Times Critics Poll and was selected as Alto Saxophonist of the Year by the Jazz Journalists Association in 2015, 2018, 2019 and 2020 (when he was also recognized as Arranger of the Year). In 2023 he was recognized by the same organization as the Composer of the Year. Zenón is a twelve-time Grammy nominee and a seven-time Latin Grammy nominee. In 2008 he received a fellowship from the John Simon Guggenheim Foundation (which resulted in his recording Esta Plena) and later that year also received a fellowship from the MacArthur Foundation. In 2022 he received an Honorary Doctorate in The Arts from Universidad del Sagrado Corazón in San Juan, Puerto Rico, the highest honor bestowed by the institution. The 2023 Puerto Rico Master Card Jazz Festival (formerly Heineken Jazz Festival) was dedicated to Zenón and his career, featuring his working band along with many special guests. In 2024 he received the Doris Duke Artist Award.

== Discography ==
=== As leader ===
- Looking Forward (Fresh Sound, 2002)
- Ceremonial (Marsalis Music, 2004)
- Jíbaro (Marsalis, 2005)
- Awake (Marsalis, 2008) – recorded in 2007
- Esta Plena (Marsalis, 2009)
- Alma Adentro: The Puerto Rican Songbook (Marsalis, 2011)
- Rayuela with Laurent Coq (Sunnyside, 2012) – recorded in 2011
- Oye!!! Live in Puerto Rico with The Rhythm Collective (Miel Music, 2013) – live recorded in 2011
- Identities are Changeable (Miel Music, 2014)
- Típico (Miel Music, 2017)
- Yo Soy La Tradición (Miel Music, 2018)
- Sonero: The Music of Ismael Rivera (Miel Music, 2019)
- El Arte Del Bolero (Miel Music, 2021)
- Law Years: The Music of Ornette Coleman (Miel Music, 2021)
- Música De Las Américas (Miel Music, 2022)
- El Arte Del Bolero Vol.2 (Miel Music, 2023)
- Golden City (Miel Music, 2024)
- Miguel Zenón Vanguardia Subterránea: Live At The Village Vanguard (Miel Music, 2025)

=== As a member ===
SFJAZZ Collective

- Live at The SFJAZZ Center 2017 (SFJAZZ, 2018)
- Live at The SFJAZZ Center 2016 (SFJAZZ, 2017)
- Live at The SFJAZZ Center 2015 (SFJAZZ, 2016)
- Live at The SFJAZZ Center 2014 (SFJAZZ, 2015)
- 10th anniversary (SFJAZZ, 2014)
- Live at The SFJAZZ Center (SFJAZZ, 2013)
- Wonder – The Songs of Stevie Wonder (SFJAZZ, 2013)
- Live 2011 8th Annual Concert Tour (SFJAZZ, 2011)
- Live 2010 7th Annual Concert Tour (SFJAZZ, 2010)
- Live 2009 6th Annual Concert Tour (SFJAZZ, 2009)
- Live 2008 5th Annual Concert Tour (SFJAZZ, 2008)
- Live 2007 4th Annual Concert Tour (SFJAZZ, 2007)
- Live 2006 3rd Annual Concert Tour (SFJAZZ, 2007)
- SFJAZZ Collective 2 (Nonesuch, 2006)
- Live 2005 2nd Annual Concert Tour (SFJAZZ, 2006)
- SFJAZZ Collective (Nonesuch, 2005)
- Inaugural Season 2004 (SFJAZZ, 2004)

The Liberation Music Orchestra

- Not in Our Name (Verve, 2005) – rec. 2004

=== As sideman ===
With César Cardoso

- Interchange (Antena 2, 2018)
- Dice of Tenors (self-released, 2020)

With Hans Glawischnig

- Common Ground (Fresh Sound, 2003)
- Panorama (Sunnyside, 2008)

With Charlie Haden

- 2003: Land of the Sun (Verve, 2004)
- 2004: Not in Our Name (Verve, 2005)

With Guillermo Klein

- Los Guachos 3 (Sunnyside, 2002)
- Filtros (Sunnyside, 2008)
- Bienestan (Sunnyside, 2011)
- Carrera (Sunnyside, 2012)
- Los Guachos V (Sunnyside, 2016)

With Brian Lynch

- 24/7 (Nagel Heyer, 2005)
- Spheres of Influence Suite (Ewe, 2006)

With Paoli Mejias

- Mi Tambor (Paoli Mejias, 2004)
- Transcend (not on label, 2006)
- Jazzambia (CD Baby, 2008)
- Abriendo Camino (Bandcamp, 2018)

With Miles Okazaki

- Mirror (self-released, 2006)
- Generations (Sunnyside, 2009)
- Figurations (Sunnyside, 2012)

With Luis Perdomo

- Focus Point (RKM, 2004)
- Links (Criss Cross, 2013)

With David Sánchez

- Melaza (Columbia, 2001)
- Travesía (Columbia, 2002)
- Coral (Sony, 2004)

With others

- Bobby Avey, Authority Melts From Me (Whirlwind, 2014)
- Jeff Ballard, Time's Tales (Okeh, 2014)
- Ray Barreto, Homage to Art Blakey (Sunnyside, 2003)
- Edmar Castañeda, Double Portion (2012)
- Henry Cole, Roots Before Branches (2012)
- Stephan Crump, Tuckahoe (Accurate, 2001)
- Adam Cruz, Milestone (Sunnyside, 2012)
- Alexis Cuadrado, A Lorca Soundscape (Sunnyside, 2013)
- Fernando García, Guasábara Puerto Rico (Zoho, 2018)
- David Gilmore, Numerology – Live at The Jazz Standard (2012)
- Edsel Gomez, Cubist Music (Zoho, 2006)
- Julien Labro, From This Point Forward (Azica, 2014)
- Jason Lindner, Live at The Jazz Gallery (Ansic, 2007)
- The Mingus Big Band,* I Am Three (2005)
- Stu Mindeman, Woven Threads (2018)
- Andy Montañez, Sueño (November 2012)
- Rafael Pannier, Letter To A Friend (2023)
- PRISM Quartet, Heritage/Evolution Vol. 1 (Innova, 2015)
- Antonio Sánchez, Live in New York at Jazz Standard (CAM Jazz, 2010)
- Dan Tepfer, Internal Melodies (2023)
- Anthony Tidd (Quite Sane), The Child of Troubled Times (Rykodisc, 2002)
- Dan Weiss, Sixteen: Drummers Suite (Pi Recordings, 2016)
- Kenny Werner, Coalition (Half Note, 2014)
- Either/Orchestra, More Beautiful than Death (Accurate, 2000)
- Either/Orchestra, Afro-Cubism (Accurate, 2002)

=== As co-producer ===
With Jonathan Suazo

- Extracts of a Desire (self-released, 2013)

With Raphael Pannier

- Faune (French Paradox, 2020)

With Gabriel Vicéns

- The Way We Are Created (Inner Circle Music, 2021)
