= Russ Gershon =

American saxophonist, composer, and arranger (born 1959)

Russ Gershon (born August 11, 1959) is an American saxophonist, composer, arranger, who founded the Either/Orchestra in Massachusetts in 1985.

== Early years and education ==
Gershon grew up in Westport, Connecticut and attended Harvard University where he received a degree in philosophy and was a disc jockey, jazz director and station manager at Harvard's WHRB radio station. He attended Berklee College of Music in 1984–85. On December 17, 1985 Either/Orchestra played its first live show at the Cambridge Public Library.

== Career ==
Gershon founded Accurate Records, which has released albums by Morphine, Medeski Martin & Wood, the Alloy Orchestra, Ghost Train Orchestra, the Either/Orchestra, Dominique Eade, and Garrison Fewell. He has been a member of rock bands the Decoders (1980–82), the Sex Execs (1982–84), Hypnosonics (1986–1999), Orchestra Morphine (2000–present), and Bourbon Princess (2003–2008). He has worked as a studio musician and has performed in Boston.

In 1997, Gershon played arrangements of Ethiopian popular music with the Either/Orchestra. This drew the attention of Francis Falceto, who produced the "Éthiopiques" series of albums to document 20th century Ethiopian music. Through Falceto's connections, Gershon and his band were invited to Addis Ababa in 2004 and became the first American big band to perform in Ethiopia since Duke Ellington's in 1973. Their principal concert was released as the album Ethiopiques 20: Live in Addis and led to working with Ethiopian musicians such as Mulatu Astatke, Mahmoud Ahmed, Getachew Mekurya, Alemayehu Eshete and Teshome Mitiku. In 2016 Gershon appeared with Ahmed's band at Carnegie Hall.

== Awards and honors ==
Grammy Award nomination, Best Original Arrangement of an Instrumental Composition, "Bennie Moten's Weird Nightmare"

== Discography ==
=== As leader ===
With Either/Orchestra

- Dial "E" (Accurate, 1987)
- Radium (Accurate, 1988)
- The Half-Life of Desire (Accurate, 1990)
- The Calculus of Pleasure (Accurate, 1992)
- The Brunt (Accurate, 1994)
- Across the Omniverse (Accurate, 1996)
- More Beautiful than Death (Accurate, 2000)
- Afro-Cubism (Accurate, 2002)
- Neo-Modernism (Accurate, 2004)
- Ethiopiques Vol. 20: Live in Addis (Buda Musique, 2005)
- Mood Music for Time Travellers (Accurate, 2010)
- Ethiopiques Vol. 32: Nalbandian the Ethiopian (Buda Musique, 2025)

=== As sideman ===
With Morphine

- B-Sides and Otherwise (Rykodisc, 1997)
- Early to Bed (Rykodisc, 1997)
- Potion (Rykodisc, 1997)

With others

- Mulatu Astatke, Mulatu Steps Ahead (Strut, 2010)
- Concussion Ensemble, Stampede (Conc, 1993)
- Bob Merrill, Cheerin' Up the Universe (Accurate, 2015)
- Mark Sandman, Sandbox (Hi-n-Dry, 2004)
- Laurie Sargent, Little Dipper and the Shooting Star (Hi-n-Dry, 2013)
- Throwing Muses, Hunkpapa (4AD, 1989)
- Twinemen, Twinemen (Hi-n-Dry, 2002)
