= Afro-Cubism =

Studio album by Either/Orchestra
- Released: September 10, 2002
- Recorded: June 5, 2001 - June 7, 2001
- Studio: SoundStation 7, Providence, Rhode Island
- Genre: Jazz
- Length: 38:12
- Label: Accurate (AC-3283)
- Producer: Russ Gershon

Either/Orchestra chronology
More Beautiful than Death (2000)	Afro-Cubism (2002)	Neo-Modernism (2004)

Afro-Cubism is an album by the Either/Orchestra recorded in 2001 and released by the Accurate Records label in 2002.

== Track listing ==
1. Harvey’s Entrance (Russ Gershon) – 7:29
2. Blue Attitude (Russ Gershon) – 5:21
3. Soul Song (Russ Gershon) – 9:24
4. Look to the Lion (Gregory Burk)– 7:13
5. Breaktime for Dougo (Russ Gershon) – 8:37
6. Yezemed Yebada (Teshome Mitiku) – 5:15
7. Don’t Bother Me/No Me Molesta (George Harrison/Russ Gershon) – 3:30

== Personnel ==
- Russ Gershon – tenor saxophone, soprano saxophone, flute, arranger
- Colin Fisher – trumpet, flugelhorn
- Tom Halter – trumpet, flugelhorn
- Joel Yennoir – trombone
- Miguel Zenón – alto saxophone
- Jeremy Udden – alto saxophone, flute
- Charlie Kohlhase – baritone saxophone
- Vicente Lebron – percussion, vocals
- Rick McLaughlin – bass
- Harvey Whirt – drums
- Paul Q. Kolderie – engineer
- Rob Pemberton – engineer
