= Curtis Hasselbring =

American jazz musician

Curtis Rae Hasselbring (born July 12, 1965, in Fort Wayne, Indiana) is an American jazz trombonist, guitarist and composer.

Hasselbring learned trombone and guitar while young, though he did not play guitar professionally until the 1990s. He studied formally at the New England Conservatory, graduating in 1988, then worked with Charlie Kohlhase, the Either/Orchestra and Ken Schaphorst. He took a master's degree at Rutgers Mason Gross School of the Arts in 1991–1993, during which time he began working with Chris Speed, Bobby Previte, Cuong Vu, Satoko Fujii, and others. He is the leader of the ensembles The New Mellow Edwards (with John Hollenbeck, Trevor Dunn and Chris Speed), Decoupage (with Mary Halvorson, Matt Moran and Satoshi Takeishi), and his newest project, the Curhachestra (with Raphael McGregor, Adam Minkoff and Daniel Rieser). He has released three albums as a leader. Curtis is also active creating electronic music and remixes under the name "Curha".

== Discography ==
=== As leader ===
- The New Mellow Edwards (Skirl, 2006)
- Big Choantza (Skirl, 2009)
- Number Stations (Cuneiform, 2013)

=== Under the name "Curha" ===
- Curha I (Chant Records, 2018)
- Curha II (Chant Records, 2020)
- Curha III (Chant Records, 2022)
- Slavic Soul Party, Remixed (Barbes 2008)
- Zion80, Warriors RMX (Chant Records, 2021)

=== As sideman ===
With Either/Orchestra

- Radium (Accurate, 1988)
- The Half-Life of Desire (Accurate, 1990)
- The Calculus of Pleasure (Accurate, 1992)
- Across the Omniverse (Accurate, 1996)

With Satoko Fujii

- South Wind (Leo Lab, 1997)
- Double Take (EWE, 2000)
- Jo (Buzz, 2000)
- The Future of the Past (Enja, 2003)
- Blueprint (Natsat Music, 2004)
- Undulation (PJL, 2006)
- Fujin Raijin (Victo, 2007)
- Summer Suite (Libra, 2008)
- Watershed (Libra, 2011)
- Eto (Libra, 2011)
- Shiki (Libra, 2014)
- Fukushima (Libra, 2017)
- Entity (Libra, 2019)

With Ghost Train Orchestra

- Hothouse Stomp (Accurate, 2011)
- Book of Rhapsodies (Accurate, 2013)
- Book of Rhapsodies Vol. II (Accurate, 2017)
- Songs and Symphoniques: The Music of Moondog (Cantaloupe Music, 2023)

With Ken Schaphorst

- Making Lunch (Accurate, 1989)
- After Blue (Accurate, 1991)
- When the Moon Jumps (Accurate, 1994)
- Purple (Naxos, 1998)
- How to Say Goodbye (JCA, 2016)

With others

- George Adams, Where Were You? (GM, 1989)
- Joy Askew, Everything Is Different (2022)
- Audible Spirits (Diskoknife, 2023)
- Beat Circus, Dreamland (Cuneiform 2008)
- Oren Bloedow & Jennifer Charles, La Mar Enfortuna (Tzadik, 2001)
- Benny Carter, Harlem Renaissance (MusicMasters 1992)
- Gogol Bordello, Super Taranta! (SideOneDummy, 2007)
- Golem, Fresh Off Boat (JDub, 2006)
- Golem, Tanz (Corason, 2014)
- Jerry Granelli, Enter, a Dragon (Songlines, 1998)
- Jerry Granelli, Crowd Theory (Songlines, 1999)
- Tom Harrell, Time's Mirror (RCA Victor, 1999)
- The Jazz Passengers, Live In Spain (32 Records, 1998)
- Chris Lightcap, Superette (Royal Potato Family 2018)
- Chris Lightcap, SuperBigmouth (Pyroclastic 2019)
- Frank London, Brotherhood of Brass (Piranha, 2002)
- Boban Markovic, Boban I Marko (Piranha, 2003)
- Medeski Martin & Wood, Notes from the Underground (Accurate, 1992)
- Eric Person, Thoughts On God (Distinction, 2012)
- Bobby Previte, Too Close to the Pole (Enja, 1996)
- Roberto Juan Rodriguez, Baila! Gitano Baila! (Tzadik, 2005)
- George Schuller, Jigsaw (482 Music, 2004)
- Gunther Schuller, Jumpin' in the Future (GM, 1988)
- Ron Sexsmith, Whereabouts (Interscope, 1999)
- She & Him, Classics (Columbia, 2014)
- Assif Tsahar, Embracing the Void (Hopscotch 2001)
- Matt Wilson, Humidity (Palmetto, 2003)
