= Ayalew Mesfin =

Ethiopian musician

Ayalew Mesfin Chufa (Amharic: አያለው መስፍን ቹፋ, romanized: ʼayālaw masefené čufā) is an Ethiopian musician. He is one of the most important figures of Ethio-Groove.

== Early life ==
Mesfin was born in the ’40s in Weldiya, North Wollo. At age 11, he ran away from home to Addis Abba to pursue a career in music, which his father disapproved of. Before becoming a musician, Mesfin worked as a waiter, doorman and cashier. He later enrolled in the Ethiopian Republican Guard.

== Career ==
Mesfin's introduction to the music world was through Gétatchèw Kassa and his Soul Ekos Band, whom he performed and recorded with for some time. This was short-lasted, and he instead decided to open up a music venue, called the Stereo Club, and a record store, called Ayalew Music Shop.

In 1973, Mesfin formed the Black Lion Band with former members of the Police Pop Band, including Tamiru Ayele, Tamiru Wolde A’b, Teshome Deneke, Tamirat Ziltini, Tekle Tesfaezgi, and Giovanni Vincenzo. They started off playing at Patris Lumumba Night Club, the Stereo Club, and Etege Taitu Hotel in Addis Ababa. Eventually, Mesfin was signed by the record label Amha Eshete, where he would record a series of songs including "Hasabe," in English "My Worries."

Though hidden through seemingly mundane lyrics of love, his music was strikingly political and addressed social issues of the time. Soon enough, after the beginning of Ethiopian Civil War and the Derg's rise to power, Mesfin was imprisoned for 3 months, his property seized, and his music banned for 13 years for attempting to flee the country and distributing anti-government cassettes. During this time he was also under house arrest.

After the fall of the Derg in 1991, the Ethiopian People's Democratic Movement (EPDM) and Ethiopian People's Revolutionary Democratic Front came to power and, in reaction, Mesfin released the album Peace for Ethiopia. EPDM then attempted to assassinate Mesfin in concert.

In 1998, Mesfin moved to the United States, first staying in Minnesota, then the West Coast, and finally settling in Denver, Colorado. Here he re-opened Ayalew Music Shop.

In 2000, Mesfin was featured on Éthiopiques’ 8th volume. Later in 2009, he was featured on Golden Years of Modern Ethiopian Music, 1969–1975. Because most of his music was recorded between 1973 and 1977, a time of great political turmoil, and most of the documents regarding copyright were tied up in France, meaning Mesfin saw no royalties.

In 2018, Now-Again Records worked with Mesfin to release a compilation of his works. The same year he performed with Debo Band in Denver, Berkeley, and Los Angeles. A year later in 2019, he performed at Le Guess Who? in Amsterdam, again with Debo Band.

== Personal life ==
Mesfin resides in Denver. He is critical of current Ethiopian Prime Minister Abiy Ahmed.

== Influences ==
Mesfin is influenced by Tilahun Gessesse, Tamrat Molla, Sayed Khalifa_{,} Fela Kuti, Aretha Franklin, Sam Cooke, James Brown, and Jimi Hendrix.

Madlib has cited Ayalew Mesfin as an influence.
