= Shewalul Mengistu =

Ethiopian songwriter and activist (1944–1977)

- Born: 11 September 1944; Hararghe, Ethiopia
- Died: 26 May 1977 (aged 32); Addis Ababa, Ethiopia
- Cause of death: assassinated by being shot
- Occupations: poet, songwriter, journalist and political activist

Shewalul Mengistu (Amharic: ሸዋሉል መንግሥቱ; 11 September 1944 – 26 May 1977) was an Ethiopian poet, songwriter, journalist and political activist. She was assassinated in 1977.

== Family ==
Shewalul was born in Hararghe, Ethiopia, to a middle-class family. Her father was a musician who played the bägäna, a ten-stringed lyre. Shewalul was married at the age of 13 to a commander in the Ethiopian security forces. They had five children and later divorced.

== Career ==
In 1973, Shewalul was employed by the Ministry of Information in Addis Ababa, where she produced radio and television programmes aimed at women.

Shewalul spoke Amharic and Oromo and wrote the song Erè Mèla Mèla, most known when sung by Mahmoud Ahmed. She also became a political writer, with her works including several poems (one of which was banned from broadcasting and publication) and a pamphlet critical of Ethiopian society.

== Death ==
She became a member of the Marxist-Leninist party of Mengistu Haile Mariam, who later became dictator. She was assassinated in Addis Ababa in 1977, dying after being shot.
