= Jeremy Udden =

American musician (born 1978)

Jeremy Udden (born April 29, 1978) is an American musician, composer, and educator. Proficient in both the Alto and Soprano Saxophone, Udden also composes songs for his groups, Plainville and Torchsongs Trio. His most notable albums from these groups include If the Past Seems So Bright, Plainville, and Torchsongs. He has performed at a variety of venues, including Merkin Hall, Cornelia Street Cafe, and Carnegie Hall. Critics describe Udden's style as "melodic jazz-rock" and a "marrying of country, surf rock and blues." He was born in Plainville, Massachusetts and currently resides in Brooklyn, New York, where he teaches at the Packer Collegiate Institute.

== Early life ==
Udden was born and raised in Plainville, Massachusetts. He first heard of the saxophone in 3rd grade, when he attended an elementary school band concert. Receiving his own instrument shortly after, he went on to develop a strong interest in music throughout his adolescent and teen years, participating in the marching and jazz bands at King Philip Regional High School. Growing up, Udden developed further interest in jazz and ska, performing regularly in the Boston scene with groups such as Big Lick, an 8-piece punk-skaband.

During his last year of high school, Udden was accepted to the All-Eastern Jazz Ensemble, a highly competitive group of the best teen jazz players on the East Coast. In addition to All-Eastern, Udden was also accepted to the prestigious Grammy Band, which performs annually at the Grammy Awards.

== Education ==
Udden moved to Boston in 1996, where he entered the New England Conservatory. There, he studied with a wide variety of faculty, including Allan Chase, Jerry Bergonzi, George Garzone, Paul Bley, Charlie Banacos, Steve Lacy, Danilo Pérez, Fred Hersch, and Bob Brookmeyer. Udden graduated in 2000, majoring in Jazz Performance with a concentration in Education (B.M., M.M.).

== Career ==
After graduating, Udden went on to perform and record with a wide variety of groups and musicians, such as Big Lick, Either/Orchestra, Andreea Pauta, Robert Stillman, Kurt Weisman, and The Jazz Composer's Alliance Orchestra.

Udden currently leads his own band, Plainville, which performs regularly in New York City. Featuring Brandon Seabrook (guitar/banjo), Pete Rende (rhodes/pump organ/moog), Eivind Opsvik (bass), and RJ Miller (drums), Planville released its debut self-titled album, Plainville, through Fresh Sounds Records to much critical acclaim. Jazzman Magazine has praised Udden for his "...resolutely new music where eclecticism and personal experience play an important role". Plainville went on to release a second album, If The Past Seems So Bright on Sunnyside Records in 2011.

Udden's work as an educator has spanned across several institutions and countries, including the Yared Music School (Addis Ababa, Ethiopia), The Jazz School (Yaroslavl, Russia), University of Vermont, Keen State College, Lawrence University, University of Iowa, Cleveland State University, and Webster University. He has given clinics on improvisation at the King Philip Regional High School and Blackstone-Millville Regional High School. Udden has also been a classroom instructor at the University of Rhode Island, the New England Conservatory of Music, the Longy School of Music, and Emerson College.

Udden was the winner of the 2003 Fish-Middleton Jazz Competition in Washington, D.C. and a finalist for the 2005 ASCAP Young Composer Award.

Currently, Udden teaches middle and upper school students at the Packer Collegiate Institute in Brooklyn, NY, as well as at the Maine Jazz Camp during summer.

== Discography ==
Udden has released a total of four albums as bandleader (including two with Plainville), and has made several guest appearances throughout his career.

=== As Leader ===
- Torchsongs (Fresh Sound New Talent, 2006)
- Folk Art (Fresh Sound New Talent, 2012)

=== With Plainville ===
- Plainville (Fresh Sound New Talent, 2009)
- If The Past Seems So Bright (Sunnyside, 2011)

=== As Guest ===
- Big Lick-Big Lick (Rackem, 1995)
- Big Lick-The Hills Are Alive (Rackem, 1998)
- Andreea Pauta-Spring (2001)
- GSU-The Effect (Creative Nation, 2001)
- Either/Orchestra-Afro-Cubism (Accurate, 2002)
- Jazz Composer's Alliance Orchestra-Death of Simone Weil (Innova, 2003)
- Rick McLaughlin-Study of Light (Accurate, 2003)
- Either/Orchestra-Neo-Modernism (Accurate, 2003)
- Planet Earth-Planet Earth EP (2004)
- Jazz Composer's Alliance Orchestra-Celebration of the Spirit (CIMP, 2004)
- Catshow Snapshots-Self-Portrait (2004)
- Peter Kenegy-Little Machines (Fresh Sound New Talent, 2005)
- Either/Orchestra-Ethiopiques 20: Live in Addis (Buda Musique, 2005)
- Monika Heidemann-Bright (2006)
- Prana Trio-Pranam (Brian Adler and Circavision Productions, 2006)
- Andreea Pauta-Autumn (2007)
- Holus Bolus-All Together At Once (2007)
- Mahmoud Ahmed & Either/Orchestra (DVD)-Ethiogroove (Buda Musique, 2007)
- Andy Mcwain Ensemble-Resemblance (2008)
- Nicholas Urie Large Ensemble-Excerpts From An Online Dating Service with Chris Speed, Bill Mchenry, Frank Carlberg, Joe Martin, Christine Correa (Red Piano, 2009)
- Joao Lencastre’s Communion-B-Sides with David Binney, Phil Grenedier, Thomas Morgan, Leo Genovese, JL (Fresh Sound New Talent)
