= This Is Fort Apache =

Compilation album by various artists
- Released: 1995
- Studio: Fort Apache
- Genre: Alternative rock
- Length: 47:45
- Label: Fort Apache/MCA

This Is Fort Apache is a 1995 compilation album of songs recorded at Fort Apache Studios, a recording studio which has had several locations around the New England area. The alternative rock album was the first release of Fort Apache/MCA Records, a partnership between the studio and MCA Records. The album's packaging work, by designer Tim Stedman, received a nomination for the Grammy Award for Best Recording Package at the 38th Annual Grammy Awards ceremony, losing to Robbie Cavolina and Joni Mitchell for Turbulent Indigo. The album includes songs by the label's first signees Cold Water Flat and studio silent partner Billy Bragg.

== Style ==
The album is described as alternative rock. De Volkskrant's Gert van Veen notes that the diverse styles of the different acts are unified by their use of a "nice and raw", "piercing" guitar sound which was "partly determined by the primitive conditions" of the studio in its early years, a sound which by the compilation's time had become standard with the popularity of grunge and post-grunge.

== Reception ==
Cashbox's Steve Baltin called the album an "impressive compilation" with an "attention-grabbing" opening track from Cold Water Flat and further strong showings from the Walkabouts, Buffalo Tom, and Treat Her Right. Billboard called it a "welcome salute to one of the nation's most dynamic recording facilities". The Heights' Brian J. DiMattia called the album "Boston indie rock at its best" which would have warranted a four-star rating if not for the record coming in poor packaging docking it half a star.

AllMusic's Jonathan Lewis also noted Treat Her Right as a highlight, as well as Radiohead and Billy Bragg, while calling the work of other acts "standard". Lewis concluded that while the album features several "heavyweights" of early 1990s alt rock, it's the "lesser-known artists who manage to shine through." The Washington Post's Mark Jenkins said few of the songs were catchy, with "Anyone Can Play Guitar" and "Off to One Side" being notable exceptions, but that those two songs are both available on their respective bands' albums so they wouldn't compel fans to purchase the compilation.

== Track listing ==
This Is Fort Apache track listing
No.	Title	Writer(s)	Artist	Length
1.	"Magnetic North Pole"	Paul Harding; Paul Janovitz; Ted Silva	Cold Water Flat	2:50
2.	"Not You Again"	J Mascis	Dinosaur Jr.	2:28
3.	"Star" (alternate version of song from the album Star)	Tanya Donnelly	Belly	3:00
4.	"Stove" (originally released on the album Lovey)	Evan Dando	The Lemonheads	3:08
5.	"Murdering Stone" (originally released on the album New West Motel)	Chris Eckman	The Walkabouts	3:12
6.	"Crutch" (originally released on the album Let Me Come Over)	Bill Janovitz; Chris Colbourn; Tom Maginnis	Buffalo Tom	4:02
7.	"Run Letter" (originally released on the album House Tornado)	Kristin Hersh	Throwing Muses	5:03
8.	"The Freed Pig" (originally released on the album Sebadoh III)	Lou Barlow	Sebadoh	3:08
9.	"Anyone Can Play Guitar" (originally released on the album Pablo Honey)	Thom Yorke; Jonny Greenwood; Colin Greenwood; Ed O'Brien; Phil Selway	Radiohead	3:37
10.	"Here Comes the Pain" (B-side to the single "I See You")	Juliana Hatfield	Juliana Hatfield	3:42
11.	"Sulk"	Billy Bragg; Cara Tivey	Billy Bragg	3:47
12.	"I Think She Likes Me" (originally released on the album Treat Her Right)	Mark Sandman	Treat Her Right	3:41
13.	"Off to One Side" (originally released on the album 11:11)	Come	Come	5:46
Total length:				47:45
