= Skins (Buffalo Tom album) =

2011 studio album by Buffalo Tom

Studio album by Buffalo Tom
- Released: March 8, 2011
- Studio: Q Division, Camp Street, home
- Length: 46:20
- Label: Scrawny Records
- Producer: Buffalo Tom

Buffalo Tom chronology
Three Easy Pieces (2007)	Skins (2011)	Quiet and Peace (2018)

Skins is the eighth studio album by American band Buffalo Tom, released in 2011 on Scrawny Records. The album was released in CD, LP and deluxe double CD formats as well as for download and streaming. The deluxe double CD edition included a disc of demos.

The band's previous album, Three Easy Pieces (2007), had been their first after an almost decade-long layoff during which the band became a part-time concern and singer-guitarist Bill Janovitz made solo and side-project recordings. Skins followed relatively swiftly, after another four years. The band produced it themselves, recording both at home and in Boston-area recording studios. Belly singer and solo artist Tanya Donelly guests as a singer on one track. Most of the tracks were mixed by Paul Q. Kolderie, who had co-produced their third album Let Me Come Over (1992), and Adam Taylor, with the remainder mixed by Janovitz's side-project bandmate Tom Polce.

The album is described by Metacritic as having had "generally favourable reviews", with a Metascore of 72, while AnyDecentMusic? gives it a rating of 6.7. Allmusic's Mark Deming calls it "a personal and introspective work", that "as reflects a band of forty-somethings [...] deals with the stuff of grown-up lives."

== Track listing ==
All songs written by Buffalo Tom (Bill Janovitz, Chris Colbourn, Tom Maginnis).

1. "Arise, Watch" – 2:39
2. "She's Not Your Thing" – 2:04
3. "Down" – 4:27
4. "Don't Forget Me" – 4:07
5. "Guilty Girls" – 2:23
6. "Miss Barren Brooks" – 3:11
7. "Paper Knife" – 3:38
8. "Here I Come" – 3:02
9. "Lost Weekend" – 4:06
10. "The Hawks & the Sparrows" – 4:10
11. "The Big Light" – 4:04
12. "The Kids Just Sleep" – 3:15
13. "Out of the Dark" – 4:10
14. Unlisted reprise of "Don't Forget Me" – 1:10 (in some versions extends track 13 to 5:34)

== Personnel ==
- Jon Aanestad - violin on "The Hawks & the Sparrows"
- Tanya Donelly - vocals on "Don't Forget Me"
- Duke Levine - lead guitar on "Paper Knife"
- Sean Staples - mandolin on "Don't Forget Me"
- Buffalo Tom (Bill Janovitz, Chris Colbourn, Tom Maginnis) - all other instruments, production
- Joe Tooley, Matt Tahaney, Jon Lupfer - engineers
- Tom Polce - mixing
- Paul Q. Kolderie and Adam Taylor - mixing
