= Session Americana =

US musical group

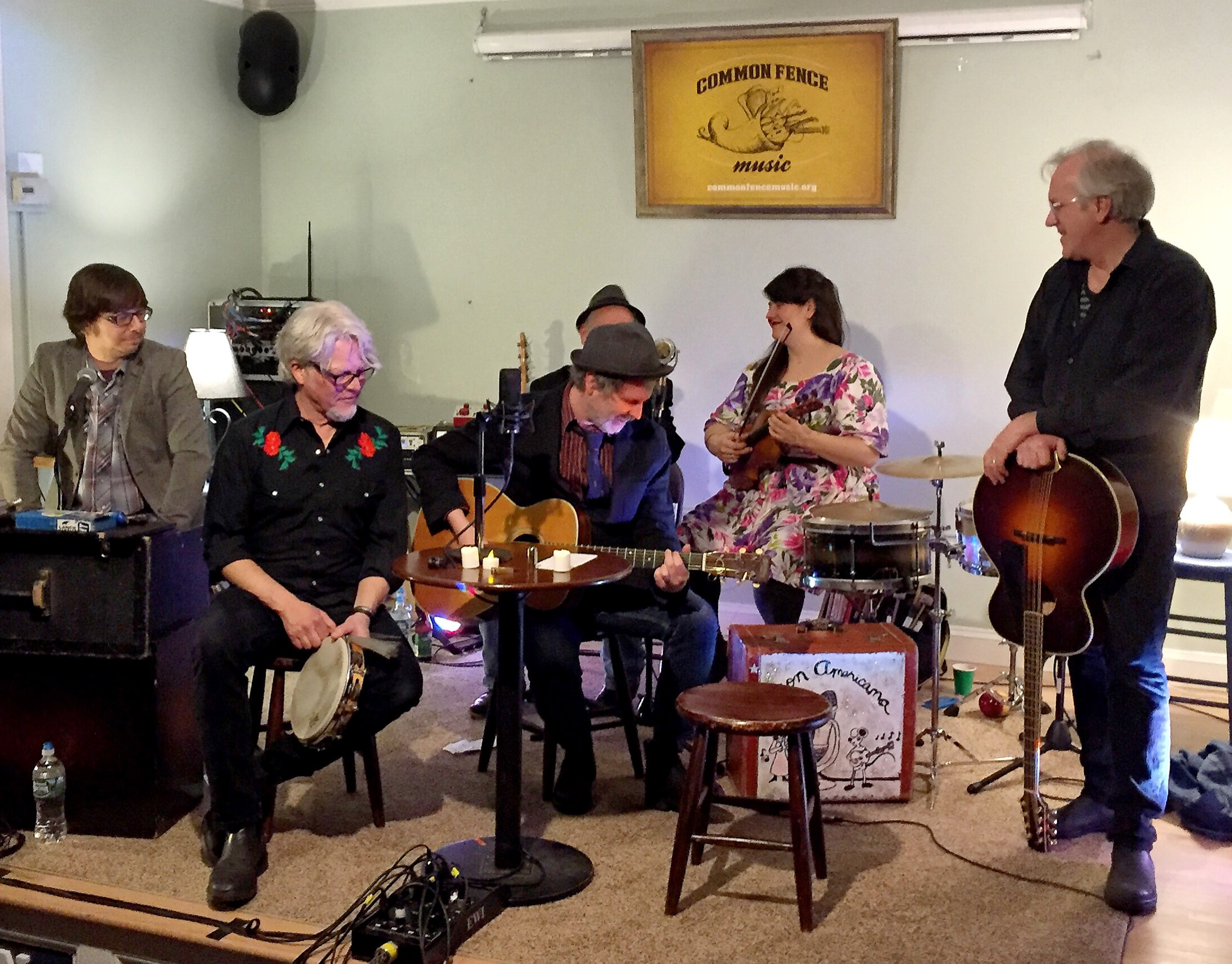
- Session Americana with Laura Cortese in 2017

Background information
- Origin: Cambridge, Massachusetts
- Genres: Americana, folk, roots music, rock, blues
- Years active: 2004–present
- Label: Hi-n-Dry
- Members: Dinty Child; Jim Fitting; Billy Beard; Ry Cavanaugh; Kimon Kirk; Jefferson Hamer
- Website: www.sessionamericana.com

Session Americana is a Boston-based folk/rock band/collective.

== History ==
This six-member group of musicians came together in 2003 for informal shows at Toad (a pub in Cambridge) on Sunday nights, with Sean Staples (mandolin, guitar, vocals), Jim Fitting (harmonica, vocals), Ry Cavanaugh (multi instruments, vocals), Billy Beard (drums, vocals), Kimon Kirk (bass) and Dinty Child (multi instruments, vocals). Kirk moved to Los Angeles in early 2009 to play with, among others, Aimee Mann and Grant Lee Phillips, and was replaced by Jon Bistline although Kirk continued to be the primary touring bass player for three more years.

Session Americana had a Sunday-night residency at Toad for two years, moving to the larger Lizard Lounge in Cambridge, Massachusetts when their popularity outgrew Toad’s small capacity. The name "Session Americana" (the bartenders wrote it on the sandwich board outside Toad on Sunday nights) went with them even though by this point they were evolving into more of a band. Even though they have steadily played larger stages to more people, they've tried to hold onto the things that make them unique and their shows continue to involve the band facing each other around a table with a single mic in the middle, passing instruments around as needed, harmonizing on old blues tunes, classic Americana songs, oddball covers, and primarily original numbers written by the group members and their friends. A hallmark of Session Americana is their frequent collaboration on-stage with musical guests, including Rose Polenzani (with whom Session Americana recorded “When the River Meets the Sea” in 2008), Jennifer Kimball (who is married to Cavanaugh), Dennis Brennan, Peter Wolf, Patty Griffin, Rachael Price, Aoife O'Donovan, and many more.

The band released four albums and continued their Lizard Lounge residency until slowing down concert appearances in late 2009 following Cavanaugh and Kimball’s move to Ireland for 2009–2010. They reunited for a concert in October 2009 at the Brattle Theatre in Cambridge, MA, alongside Buffalo Tom’s Bill Janovitz, and again for a tour in Ireland in May 2010. On Kimball and Cavanaugh's return to Boston, the band started playing again regularly and have been back to Europe every year since, spending a total of seven weeks there in 2015. In 2015 they also outgrew the Lizard Lounge and started selling out venues like the Oberon Theater in Harvard Square as well as doing more extensive touring nationwide and playing festivals all over the country and in Europe.

From the fall of 2010 the band worked without Sean Staples, who suffered a voice injury, and for five years evolved into more of a collective. Jefferson Hamer, Laura Cortese, Duke Levine, Jimmy Ryan, Adam Moss, Alec Spiegelman, and Jason Anick have all been in "seat 6" since then, with Laura, Adam, and Jefferson doing the bulk of the gigs. January 2016 marked another turning point when Jefferson and the band wrote and recorded a new album, Great Shakes, in Kimon's house using Jefferson's engineering skills and an extensive collection of gear. It was the first Session Americana album completely conceived as a six-piece band and Jefferson has been playing almost all the shows since then.

== The band ==
- Jim Fitting was one of the founders of Fort Apache Studios. He has been a member of the bands Treat Her Right, the Sex Execs, The Coots, The The, Chris Smither, and many other groups.
- Dinty Child performs solo, is a well-known Boston writer and side man, and fronts the 15-piece party band The Funky White Honkies. He has played for many years with Chandler Travis of the Incredible Casuals (including opening for George Carlin), in the Chandler Travis Philharmonic and The Catbirds, and also Laurie Sargent, among many others.
- Billy Beard is the booking agent for Toad and Lizard Lounge in Cambridge, Massachusetts. He was a member of the '80s band Face to Face, and as a drummer has toured and recorded with Patty Griffin, Kim Richey, Lori McKenna and many other artists.
- Ry Cavanaugh is a singer-songwriter who performs on his own and previously performed with Jennifer Kimball (formerly of The Story) in the group Maybe Baby and was a founding member of the Vinal Avenue String Band with Sean Staples. He has co-toured Europe with Jeffrey Foucault.
- Kimon Kirk has performed with many musicians, including Aimee Mann. He performs his original music with his band The Meds.
- Jefferson Hamer (guitar and mandolin) lives in New York City. He performs on his own, and with The Murphy Beds and Anaïs Mitchell.

== Past members and collaborators ==
- Sean Staples
- Jon Bistline (Jon co-founded and toured with the rock band Chauncey until the group’s breakup in 2005. He has played with a variety of bands since.)
- Laura Cortese (fiddle) (a singer-songwriter and fiddler who performs primarily as Laura Cortese and the Dance Cards, and tours with other artists)
- Alec Spiegelman
- Dietrich Strause
- Zach Hickman
- Adam Moss
- Stash Wyslouch

== Discography ==
- TableTop People Vol. 1. (2005) Hi-n-Dry. A family-geared album.
- TableTop People Vol. 2. (2005) Hi-N-Dry.
- The Blue Void Trilogy. Session Americana was the studio band for French artist Bruno Green's Void Trilogy (2006) Hi-N-Dry.
- TableTop People Vol. 3: Beertown. (2007) Hi-N-Dry.
- When the River Meets the Sea. Rose Polenzani with Session Americana (2008), recorded in the Summer of 2006 at Hi-N-Dry Studio.
- Diving for Gold. (2009) produced by Paul Q. Kolderie
- Live (2011)
- Love and Dirt. (October 2012) produced by Paul Q. Kolderie
- Pack Up The Circus. (May 2015) produced by Session Americana and Anaïs Mitchell
- Great Shakes. (September 2016) Produced by Session Americana and Jefferson Hamer
- Live at the Haybarn Theatre. (2018)
- Northeast (2019)

== Awards/nominations ==
- Winner "2005 Best Folk Act" - The Boston Music Awards
- Winner "Best Roots Act 2006" - Improper Bostonian "Best of Boston" Issue
- Winner "Best Album by a Local Artist" 2007 - Improper Bostonian
- Nominated "Best Roots Act" 2007 - WFNX/Boston Phoenix Best Music Poll
- Nominated "Best Live Act" 2007 - The Boston Music Awards
- Nominated "Best Americana/Roots Act" 2006–2014 - The Boston Music Awards
- Winner "Best Live Residency" 2011 - The Boston Music Awards
- Nominated "Best Album, Love and Dirt" 2012 - The Boston Music Awards
- Winner "Best Live Ongoing Residency" 2014 - The Boston Music Awards
- Nominated "Best Album, Pack Up The Circus" and "Best Americana Act" 2015 - The Boston Music Awards
- Nominated "Americana Artist of the Year" 2016–2021 - The Boston Music Awards

== References and articles ==
- Review: "Shakin' with Session Americana", September 7, 2016. Twangville. https://twangville.com/25115/shakin-with-session-americana/
- "Review: Session Americana: 'Great Shakes'", August 26, 2016. The Boston Herald. https://www.bostonherald.com/entertainment/music/2016/08/review_session_americana_great_shakes
- "Americana Music Fest: 27 Must-See Acts". September 15, 2015. Rolling Stone. https://www.rollingstone.com/music/lists/americana-music-fest-2015-27-must-see-acts-20150915/session-americana-20150915
- “Listen Up: Session Americana.” June 10, 2009. https://twangville.com/1321/listen-up-session-americana/
- “Local Music Scene Springs to Life.” By Jonathan Perry. May 8, 2009. *boston.com
- "Session Americana: Turning the Table on Traditional Music" by Gary Miller. State of Mind Magazine (VT) February/March 2008 (http://www.stateofmindmusic.com), p. 12-13
