= Buffalo Tom (album) =

Studio album by Buffalo Tom
- Released: 1989
- Recorded: 1988
- Studio: Fort Apache, Roxbury
- Genre: Alternative rock
- Label: SST (250); Beggars Banquet
- Producer: J Mascis, Buffalo Tom

Buffalo Tom chronology
Buffalo Tom (1989)	Birdbrain (1990)

Buffalo Tom is the debut studio album by the American alternative rock band Buffalo Tom, released in 1989 and featuring production from J Mascis.

== Critical reception ==
Professional ratings
Review scores
Source	Rating
AllMusic	2.5/5 stars

AllMusic wrote that "some bands offer up everything they have on their first album, and some bands just get started; Buffalo Tom indicates that this band was clearly in the latter category, but if they had a way to go in the originality sweepstakes, there was no arguing they had plenty of talent and potential."

== Track listing ==
1. "Sunflower Suit"
2. "The Plank"
3. "Impossible"
4. "500,000 Warnings"
5. "The Bus"
6. "Racine"
7. "In the Attic"
8. "Flushing Stars"
9. "Walk Away"
10. "Reason Why"
11. "Blue"
12. "Deep in the Ground"

== Personnel ==
Buffalo Tom

- Bill Janovitz - vocals, guitar, piano
- Tom Maginnis - drums, percussion
- Chris Colbourn - bass, guitar, vocals

with:

- J Mascis - lead guitar on "Impossible"
- Phil Retelle - backing vocals on "Flushing Stars"

Produced by J Mascis and Buffalo Tom.

Mixed by Sean Slade, engineered by Tim O'Heir.
