= Tied to the Tracks =

Tied to the Tracks may refer to:

== Music ==
- Tied to the Tracks, a 1981 album by Shona Laing
- Tied to the Tracks (album), a 1989 album by Treat Her Right
- "Tied to the Tracks", a 1990 song by Glen Campbell from Walkin' in the Sun
- "Tied to the Tracks", a 1986 song by Soul Asylum from Made to Be Broken
- "Tied to the Tracks", a 2019 song by Tesla from Shock

== Other uses ==
- "Tied to the Tracks" (Orange Is the New Black), a 2017 television episode
- Tied to the Tracks, a 2006 novel by Rosina Lippi

== See also ==
- Tied to the Trax, a 1986 album by Purgatory, fronted by Jeffrey Hatrix
