= Cold Water Flat =

American band

- Origin: Amherst, Massachusetts, United States
- Genres: Alternative rock, grunge
- Years active: 1990–1997?
- Labels: Play It Again Sam; MCA Records
- Past members: Paul Janovitz; Paul Harding; Ted Silva

Cold Water Flat was an American band formed in 1990 by Paul Janovitz (vocals and guitar), Ted Silva (bass) and Paul Harding (drums) when the trio studied at University of Massachusetts Amherst. Paul Janovitz is the younger brother of Bill Janovitz, lead singer and songwriter of Buffalo Tom. They began playing shows in Boston before Janovitz moved to New York; the group nearly split up, but when European label Play It Again Sam offered to release an album, they reconsidered. In 1995, they signed with MCA Records and released a self-titled second album, recorded at Fort Apache Studios, but despite getting some airplay mainly in US college radio stations the band did not reach a wider audience. Soon after the group disbanded, Janovitz went on to join Dragstrip Courage.

Paul Harding has since left music, and is best known for his debut novel Tinkers (2009) which won the 2010 Pulitzer Prize for Fiction and the 2010 PEN/Robert Bingham Fellowship for Writers.

Paul Janovitz also worked as a photographer and notably took a photo of Booker T. Jones that was used for the cover of his 2013 album Sound the Alarm. He died in Bedford, Massachusetts on February 3, 2023, at the age of 54.

== Discography ==
- Listen (Sonic Bubblegum/Play It Again Sam, 1993)
- Cold Water Flat (Fort Apache/MCA Records, 1995)
