= Birdbrain (album) =

Studio album by Buffalo Tom
- Released: 1990
- Genre: Alternative rock
- Length: 45:06
- Label: Situation Two/Beggars Banquet
- Producer: Buffalo Tom, J Mascis, Sean Slade

Buffalo Tom chronology
Buffalo Tom (1989)	Birdbrain (1990)	Let Me Come Over (1992)

Professional ratings
Review scores
Source	Rating
AllMusic	3.5/5 stars
Chicago Tribune	3/4 stars
Select	4/5 medals

Birdbrain is the second studio album by American alternative rock band Buffalo Tom, released in 1990. J Mascis again assisted with production, alongside Sean Slade. Buffalo Tom singer/guitarist Bill Janovitz said that Mascis's influence probably accented the band's edgier side. Mascis is credited as "Monte Rose" for a guitar solo on the title track.

The CD version includes a cover of the Psychedelic Furs' "Heaven," as well as a live acoustic version of "Reason Why," a song from Buffalo Tom's self-titled debut album.

== Track listing ==
All songs by Buffalo Tom except where noted

1. "Birdbrain"
2. "Skeleton Key"
3. "Caress"
4. "Guy Who Is Me"
5. "Enemy"
6. "Crawl"
7. "Fortune Teller"
8. "Baby"
9. "Directive"
10. "Bleeding Heart"
11. "Heaven (live acoustic)" (Richard Butler, Tim Butler)
12. "Reason Why (live acoustic)"

== Personnel ==
Buffalo Tom

- Bill Janovitz - vocals, guitar
- Chris Colbourn - bass, lead vocal on "Baby", guitar
- Tom Maginnis - drums

with:

- Sean Slade - guitar on "Bleeding Heart", backing vocals on "Crawl"
- "Monte Rose" (J Mascis) - guitar on "Birdbrain"
