= 2010 Pulitzer Prize =

Awards for journalism and related fields

The 2010 Pulitzer Prizes were awarded on Monday, April 12, 2010. In journalism, The Washington Post won four awards while The New York Times won three. For the first time, an online source, ProPublica, won in what had previously been the sole province of print. A musical, Next to Normal, won the Drama award for the first time in 14 years. Country singer-songwriter Hank Williams, who died at age 29 in 1953, received a special citation. The winner(s) in each category are:

== Journalism ==
- Pulitzer Prize for Public Service to Bristol Herald Courier, Virginia, "for the work of Daniel Gilbert in illuminating the murky mismanagement of natural-gas royalties owed to thousands of land owners in southwest Virginia, spurring remedial action by state lawmakers."
- Pulitzer Prize for Breaking News Reporting to The Seattle Times staff "for its comprehensive coverage, in print and online, of the shooting deaths of four police officers in a coffee house and the 40-hour manhunt for the suspect."
- Pulitzer Prize for Investigative Reporting to Barbara Laker and Wendy Ruderman of the Philadelphia Daily News "for their resourceful reporting that exposed a rogue police narcotics squad, resulting in an FBI probe and the review of hundreds of criminal cases tainted by the scandal" and Sheri Fink of ProPublica, in collaboration with The New York Times Magazine for a story that chronicles the urgent life-and-death decisions made by one hospital's exhausted doctors when they were cut off by the floodwaters of Hurricane Katrina.
- Pulitzer Prize for Explanatory Reporting – Michael Moss and members of The New York Times staff "for relentless reporting on contaminated hamburger and other food safety issues that, in print and online, spotlighted defects in federal regulation and led to improved practices."
- Pulitzer Prize for Local Reporting – Raquel Rutledge of the Milwaukee Journal Sentinel "for her penetrating reports on the fraud and abuse in a child-care program for low-wage working parents that fleeced taxpayers and imperiled children, resulting in a state and federal crackdown on providers."
- Pulitzer Prize for National Reporting – Matt Richtel and members of The New York Times staff "for incisive work, in print and online, on the hazardous use of cell phones, computers and other devices while operating cars and trucks, stimulating widespread efforts to curb distracted driving."
- Pulitzer Prize for International Reporting – Anthony Shadid of The Washington Post "for his rich, beautifully written series on Iraq as the United States departs and its people and leaders struggle to deal with the legacy of war and to shape the nation's future."
- Pulitzer Prize for Feature Writing – Gene Weingarten of The Washington Post "for his haunting story about parents, from varying walks of life, who accidentally kill their children by forgetting them in cars."
- Pulitzer Prize for Commentary – Kathleen Parker of The Washington Post "for her perceptive, often witty columns on an array of political and moral issues, gracefully sharing the experiences and values that lead her to unpredictable conclusions."
- Pulitzer Prize for Criticism – Sarah Kaufman of The Washington Post "for her refreshingly imaginative approach to dance criticism, illuminating a range of issues and topics with provocative comments and original insights."
- Pulitzer Prize for Editorial Writing – Tod Robberson, Colleen McCain Nelson, and William McKenzie of The Dallas Morning News "for their relentless editorials deploring the stark social and economic disparity between the city's better-off northern half and distressed southern half."
- Pulitzer Prize for Editorial Cartooning – Mark Fiore, self syndicated, appearing on SFGate.com for "his biting wit, extensive research and ability to distill complex issues set a high standard for an emerging form of commentary."
- Pulitzer Prize for Breaking News Photography – Mary Chind of The Des Moines Register "for her photograph of the heart-stopping moment when a rescuer dangling in a makeshift harness tries to save a woman trapped in the foaming water beneath a dam."
- Pulitzer Prize for Feature Photography – Craig F. Walker of The Denver Post "for his intimate portrait of a teenager who joins the Army at the height of insurgent violence in Iraq, poignantly searching for meaning and manhood."

== Letters, Drama and Music ==
- Pulitzer Prize for Fiction – Tinkers by Paul Harding (Bellevue Literary Press) "a powerful celebration of life in which a New England father and son, through suffering and joy, transcend their imprisoning lives and offer new ways of perceiving the world and mortality."
- Pulitzer Prize for Drama – Next to Normal, music by Tom Kitt, book and lyrics by Brian Yorkey "a powerful rock musical that grapples with mental illness in a suburban family and expands the scope of subject matter for musicals."
- Pulitzer Prize for History – Lords of Finance: The Bankers Who Broke the World by Liaquat Ahamed (Penguin Press) "a compelling account of how four powerful bankers played crucial roles in triggering the Great Depression and ultimately transforming the United States into the world's financial leader."
- Pulitzer Prize for Biography – The First Tycoon: The Epic Life of Cornelius Vanderbilt by T. J. Stiles (Alfred A. Knopf) "a penetrating portrait of a complex, self-made titan who revolutionized transportation, amassed vast wealth and shaped the economic world in ways still felt today."
- Pulitzer Prize for Poetry – Versed by Rae Armantrout (Wesleyan University Press) "a book striking for its wit and linguistic inventiveness, offering poems that are often little thought-bombs detonating in the mind long after the first reading."
- Pulitzer Prize for General Nonfiction – The Dead Hand: The Untold Story of the Cold War Arms Race and Its Dangerous Legacy by David E. Hoffman (Doubleday) "a well documented narrative that examines the terrifying doomsday competition between two superpowers and how weapons of mass destruction still imperil humankind."
- Pulitzer Prize for Music – Violin Concerto by Jennifer Higdon (Lawdon Press) "a deeply engaging piece that combines flowing lyricism with dazzling virtuosity."

== Special Citation ==
Hank Williams "for his craftsmanship as a songwriter who expressed universal feelings with poignant simplicity and played a pivotal role in transforming country music into a major musical and cultural force in American life."

== Controversy ==
Next to Normal, the winner of the Drama Prize, was not on the list of three candidates submitted to the twenty-member Pulitzer Prize board by the five-member Drama jury. It was added to the candidate pool after several of the board members attended a performance of the musical the night before the voting deadline and was selected as the winner by at least three-quarters of the board members. Jury chairman Charles McNulty publicly criticized the Board for its "geographic myopia" and "failure to appreciate new directions in playwriting" for overlooking the three plays that were not running on Broadway at the time of the Award in favor of one that was.
