= Quiet and Peace =

2018 album

Studio album by Buffalo Tom
- Released: March 2, 2018
- Recorded: 2016–2017
- Genre: Alternative rock, indie rock
- Length: 40:20
- Label: Banquet Records
- Producer: Buffalo Tom

Buffalo Tom chronology
Skins (2011)	Quiet and Peace (2018)	Jump Rope (2024)

Professional ratings
Aggregate scores
Source	Rating
Metacritic	76/100
Review scores
Source	Rating
AllMusic	3.5/5 stars
Mojo	4/5 stars
Q	3/5 stars
Record Collector	4/5 stars
Uncut	3.5/5 stars

Quiet and Peace is the ninth studio album by American alternative rock band Buffalo Tom. It was released on March 2, 2018 under Schoolkids Records. It was their first album in seven years.

== Critical reception ==
Quiet and Peace was met with "generally favorable" reviews from critics. At Metacritic, which assigns a weighted average rating out of 100 to reviews from mainstream publications, this release received an average score of 76, based on 9 reviews. Aggregator Album of the Year gave the release a 72 out of 100 based on a critical consensus of 7 reviews.

== Track listing ==
No.	Title	Writer(s)	Length
1.	"All Be Gone"	Buffalo Tom	3:28
2.	"Overtime"	Buffalo Tom	2:28
3.	"Roman Cars"	Buffalo Tom	3:16
4.	"Freckles"	Buffalo Tom	6:01
5.	"CatVMouse"	Buffalo Tom	3:01
6.	"Lonely Fast and Deep"	Buffalo Tom	3:10
7.	"See High the Hemlock Grows"	Buffalo Tom	3:04
8.	"In the Ice"	Buffalo Tom	2:58
9.	"Least That We Can Do"	Buffalo Tom	4:20
10.	"Slow Down"	Buffalo Tom	3:15
11.	"The Only Living Boy in New York"	Paul Simon	5:19
12.	"The Seeker (Bonus Track)"	Pete Townshend	3:03
13.	"Saturday (Bonus Track)"	Buffalo Tom	3:56
14.	"Little Sister (Why So Tired) (Bonus Track)"	Buffalo Tom	3:03

== Personnel ==
- Bill Janovitz - guitars, vocals, keyboards
- Chris Colbourn - bass guitar, vocals, guitar
- Tom Maginnis - drums, percussion
- Chris Cote, Erica Mantone, Andrea Gillis, Jennifer D'Angora - backing vocals ("Overtime")
- Dave Minehan - backing vocals ("In the Ice")
- Lucy Janovitz - backing vocals ("The Only Living Boy in New York")
- Erica Mantone - backing vocals ("CatVMouse")
- Sarah Jessop - vocals ("See High the Hemlock Grows")
- Buffalo Tom - production
- John Agnello - mixing
- Greg Calbi - mastering
