= Three Easy Pieces (album) =

Studio album by Buffalo Tom
- Released: July 9, 2007
- Genre: Alternative rock
- Length: 50:48
- Label: New West Records
- Producer: Buffalo Tom

Buffalo Tom chronology
Smitten (1998)	Three Easy Pieces (2007)	Skins (2011)

Professional ratings
Review scores
Source	Rating
AllMusic	3.5/5 stars

Three Easy Pieces is a 2007 album by American alternative rock band Buffalo Tom. The album - nine years removed from their last LP Smitten - took over two years of off-and-on recording sessions to complete.

== Track listing ==
1. "Bad Phone Call"
2. "Three Easy Pieces"
3. "You'll Never Catch Him"
4. "Bottom of the Rain"
5. "Lost Downtown"
6. "Renovating"
7. "Good Girl"
8. "Pendleton"
9. "Gravity"
10. "Hearts of Palm"
11. "September Shirt"
12. "CC and Callas"
13. "Thrown"

All songs by Buffalo Tom.

== Personnel ==
Buffalo Tom

- Bill Janovitz - vocals, guitar, piano, organ, percussion, trumpet
- Chris Colbourn - vocals, bass, guitar
- Tom Maginnis - drums, percussion

with:

- Chris Toppin - backing vocals
- Hilken Mancini - backing vocals
- Clint Conley - backing vocals
- Tim Obetz - pedal steel guitar

== Recording details ==
- Recorded at Q Division Studios
- Engineered by Matt Beaudoin and Matt Tahaney
- Mixed by Tom Polce
- Mastered by Andy VanDette
