= Big Red Letter Day =

Studio album by Buffalo Tom
- Released: September 21, 1993
- Recorded: Spring 1993
- Studio: Cherokee (Hollywood)
- Genre: Alternative rock
- Length: 41:34
- Label: Beggars Banquet
- Producers: The Robb Brothers, Buffalo Tom

Buffalo Tom chronology
Let Me Come Over (1992)	Big Red Letter Day (1993)	Sleepy Eyed (1995)

Singles from Big Red Letter Day
- 1. "Sodajerk" Released: 1993; 2. "Tree House" Released: 1993; 3. "I'm Allowed" Released: 1994; 4. "Would Not Be Denied" Released: 1994

Big Red Letter Day is the fourth album by American alternative rock band Buffalo Tom, released in 1993.

The leadoff track, "Sodajerk," was featured on the soundtrack for the short-lived television series My So-Called Life and in commercials for Nike and Pontiac. "Late at Night" was also used in an episode of My So-Called Life.

The album peaked at number 185 on the Billboard 200.

== Critical reception ==
Professional ratings
Review scores
Source	Rating
AllMusic	4/5 stars
NME	8/10
The Village Voice	C

Author Dave Thompson praised the album in his book Alternative Rock, writing that "Buffalo Tom jangle and twang with the best of them, filling Red Letter with moody melodies lightened by harmonies and the exquisite guitars. College rock rarely sounded this good."

== Track listing ==
All songs written by Buffalo Tom (as listed below).

No.	Title	Length
1.	"Sodajerk"	4:27
2.	"I'm Allowed"	4:21
3.	"Tree House"	4:15
4.	"Would Not Be Denied"	3:46
5.	"Latest Monkey"	2:46
6.	"My Responsibility"	3:34
7.	"Dry Land"	3:17
8.	"Torch Singer"	3:02
9.	"Late at Night"	3:57
10.	"Suppose"	3:12
11.	"Anything That Way"	4:57
Total length:		41:34

== Personnel ==
Buffalo Tom

- Bill Janovitz – vocals, guitar
- Chris Colbourn – bass
- Tom Maginnis – drums

== Charts ==
Chart (1993)	Peak position
Dutch Albums (Album Top 100)	47
New Zealand Albums (RMNZ)	29
Swedish Albums (Sverigetopplistan)	46
UK Albums (Official Charts)	17
US Billboard 200	185
US Heatseekers Albums (Billboard)	8
