= Olivia Frances =

American singer-songwriter

Olivia Frances (born May 23, 1996) is an American Pop Folk singer, songwriter, and musician known for her “sunshine-story-pop” sound from Cincinnati, Ohio. Frances has released three albums and has won numerous awards including VOX Pop Winner of Best Love Song at the 16th Annual Independent Music Awards. Frances has performed across the country at venues like The Levitt Pavilion in Dayton, Ohio, The Lizard Lounge in Boston, Massachusetts, and Belcourt Taps in Nashville, Tennessee.

== Early life and education ==
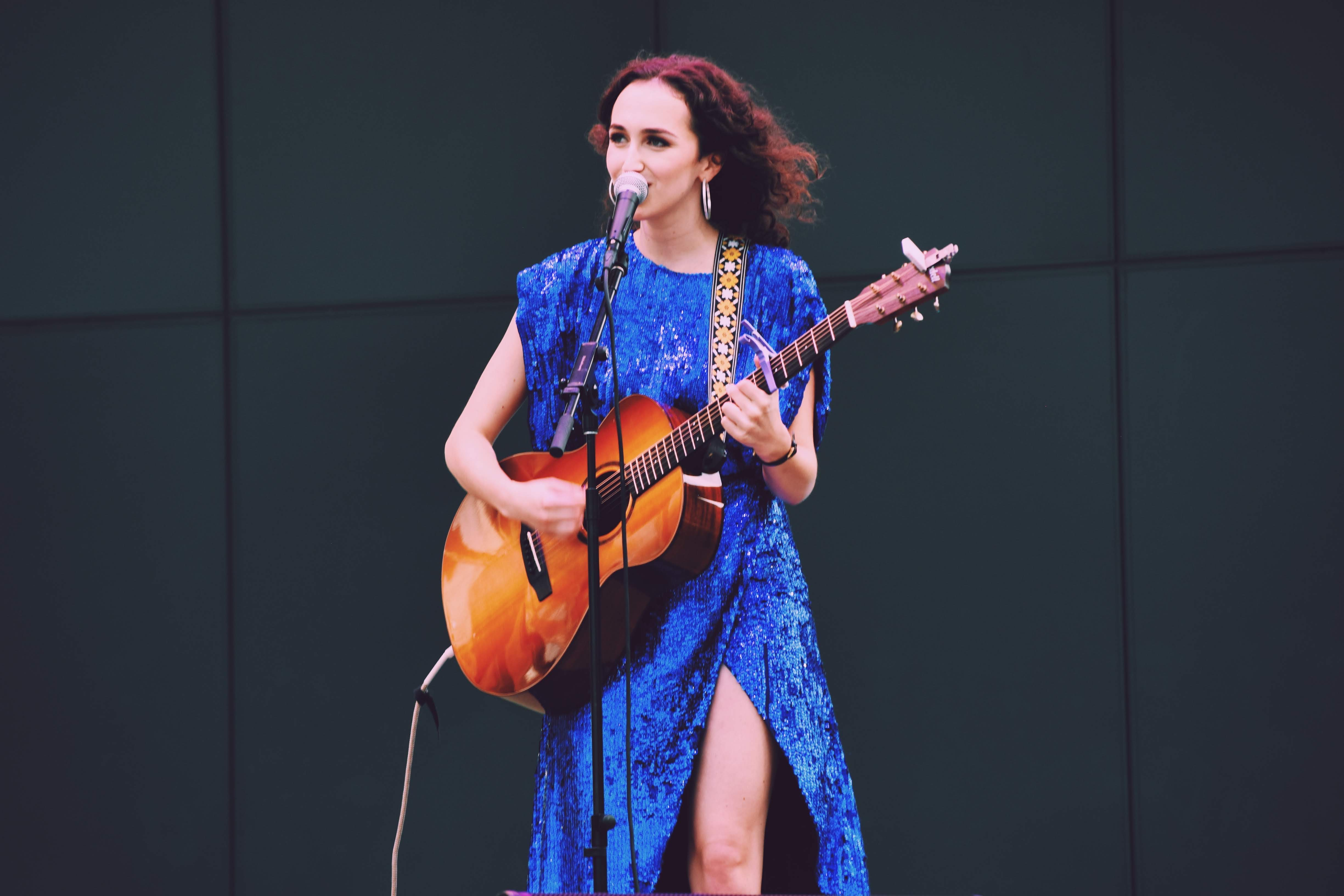
Singer/Songwriter/Environmentalist Olivia Frances playing acoustic guitar

Olivia Frances was born and raised in Cincinnati, Ohio. Her mother is a teacher and her father is a businessman. As a child, Frances loved to sing and when she was 6-years-old her parents signed her up to take piano and voice lessons at the Cincinnati Music Academy. She picked up songwriting and guitar at age 12, greatly inspired by Taylor Swift. During her high school years, Frances studied as a voice student under Jill Dew at University of Cincinnati – College-Conservatory of Music. She also studied guitar, under the direction of Joel Greenberg, at The Cincinnati Music Academy.

After her high school graduation, Frances moved to Nashville and took a gap year, performing at venues like The Commodore Grille and Bobby’s Idol Hour.

After her gap year, Frances attended Clark University in Worcester, Massachusetts. She majored in Global Environmental Studies and Minored in Music and graduated magna cum laude with a Bachelors of Arts before moving back to Nashville in July 2019.

== Career ==
The Nashville Songwriter Association International(NSAI) has named this Cincinnati native as a “One’s to Watch” songwriter over a dozen times. The songbird has written and co-written over 300 songs with hit writers such as Billy Lee (“The One” by Gary Allan), Kevin So (“Crush On You” by India Arie), and Matt Stell (“Prayed for You”). After releasing 2 new songs and getting 2 cuts with rising country artists including, "Ghost of Christmas Past" cut by co-writer Brina Kay, and “The Butterfly Song” cut by co-writer Hannah Bell - the momentum continues in 2022.

With her music reaching over 150,000 streams on Spotify, Frances continues to build a fanbase around the world. Her critically-acclaimed single, “Moon to My Sun” was the VOX Pop Winner in the Love Song Category at the 16th Annual Independent Music Awards (IMA’s), and her song, “The Bee & The Rose,” was nominated for Best Story Song at the 18th Annual IMA’s. To view a full list of awards Frances has won, click here.

In 2021, Frances performed weekly on her spring livestream concert series Midweek Magic, inviting folkie friends from her music community like Samuel Herb, Katie Dobbins, and Julia Cannon to share the virtual stage. She released “Daffodil Dreams,” a floaty, flowery love song in the summer and “Wind Chimes,” 70’s inspired reflective rumination in the fall - all the while touring solo throughout the country.

As an independent artist, Frances has organized dozens of tours throughout the Midwest, the South, and the East Coast, impressing audiences from Nashville to Boston. Notably, last year she played her first rodeo - the world’s largest - at Cheyenne Frontier Days where Maren Morris, Kane Brown, and Garth Brooks were headliners.

Musical from a young age, Frances started playing piano at age six and composed her first song on guitar at age twelve. She took a gap year between high school and college in Nashville to hone her craft and further develop her musical style. Frances credits Fleetwood Mac, Bon Iver, and Florence and the Machine as musical inspirations.

== Discography ==
=== Albums ===
Year	Album
2013	Back to Happiness
2015	Evergreen
2019	Orchid

== External links section ==
- www.oliviafrancesmusic.com Official website
