= Sleepy Eyed =

Studio album by Buffalo Tom
- Released: July 11, 1995
- Studios: Dreamland, Hurley, NY
- Genre: Alternative rock
- Length: 49:39
- Label: Beggars Banquet
- Producers: Buffalo Tom, John Agnello

Buffalo Tom chronology
Big Red Letter Day (1993)	Sleepy Eyed (1995)	Smitten (1998)

Professional ratings
Review scores
Source	Rating
AllMusic	3/5 stars
Select	4/5 medals

Sleepy Eyed is the fifth album by Buffalo Tom. The band was looking to move away from the polished sound of their previous album in favor of a more stripped-down, live-sounding approach.

The subtitle of "Twenty-Points" namechecks The Ballad of Sexual Dependency, by Nan Goldin.

== Critical reception ==
Trouser Press wrote: "Simultaneously grungy and clean, anthemic singalongs like 'Tangerine' and 'It’s You' do a lot to restore Buffalo Tom’s erstwhile status as everyone’s favorite raucously sincere college rockers."

== Track listing ==
All songs written by Buffalo Tom.

No.	Title	Length
1.	"Tangerine"	2:42
2.	"Summer"	4:02
3.	"Kitchen Door"	2:58
4.	"Rules"	2:56
5.	"It's You"	2:49
6.	"When You Discover"	2:24
7.	"Sunday Night"	6:07
8.	"Your Stripes"	3:01
9.	"Sparklers"	4:49
10.	"Clobbered"	3:15
11.	"Sundress"	2:27
12.	"Twenty-Points (The Ballad of Sexual Dependency)"	4:07
13.	"Souvenir"	2:34
14.	"Crueler"	5:28
Total length:		49:39

== Personnel ==
Buffalo Tom

- Bill Janovitz - vocals, guitar, piano, Hammond B-3, harmonica on track 7
- Chris Colbourn - bass, cello, guitar, vocals on tracks 3 & 10 & 12, harmonica on track 3
- Tom Maginnis - drums, percussion

== Charts ==
Chart (1995)	Peak position
Australian Albums (ARIA Charts)	98
