= David Champagne (musician) =

David Alcott, better known as David Champagne, is an American guitarist, singer, and songwriter. His most prominent band was Treat Her Right.

Alcott grew up in Kansas City. After spending time in New York and California, he moved to Boston, Massachusetts, where he became a longtime fixture on the local music scene. Around the turn of the 1980s, he was in Shane Champagne, which Trouser Press described as being like Graham Parker's band, the Rumour. This group issued several singles. Alcott was also in Pink Cadillac, "a sharp rockabilly-cum-rock'n'roll trio" that released one EP in 1983.

In Treat Her Right, Champagne's "tremulous slide guitar" provided part of the band's distinctive quality, as Nashville music journalist Robert K. Oermann put it. People magazine wrote that Champagne mimicked the moaning vocal-slide guitar interplay that Robert Plant and Jimmy Page did so well in the early days of Led Zeppelin. That article also noted how Champagne and Mark Sandman wrote "bona-fide bad luck songs with a wink."

Whereas Sandman achieved greater fame with Morphine, Champagne was not in the limelight after Treat Her Right disbanded. Yet he continues to perform in the Boston area under his stage name. In recent years, his project has been called Agnostic Gospel. His wife Katie has been his partner in some of his musical endeavors.

In 2019, Champagne got together with drummer Billy Conway and harmonica player Jim Fitting - the two other members of Treat Her Right - and recorded an album. A live date for the trio billed as "Billy, Jimmy, & Dave" was announced for January 19, 2020 at Club Passim in Cambridge - their first appearance together on stage since all were in Treat Her Right.
