= Mary Chind-Willie =

American photographer

- Born: May 29, 1967 (age 58); Stevens Point, Wisconsin, U.S.
- Occupation: Photographer
- Spouse: Troy Willie

Mary Chind-Willie (born May 29, 1967) is a Pulitzer Prize winning photographer.

== Biography ==
Chind-Willie was born in Stevens Point, Wisconsin. She is a 1989 graduate of the University of Wisconsin-Stevens Point, where she received her Bachelor of Fine Arts with a concentration in graphic design and communications. Currently, she lives in an in Altoona, Iowa with her husband, Troy Willie.

== Career ==
Chind-Willie is an independent photographer working in Iowa. In 1999 she joined the Des Moines Register where she worked until 2014. Previously Chind-Willie has worked for The Sierra Vista Herald as well as The Tucson Citizen.

== Awards ==
While working for the Des Moines Register, Chind-Willie won the 2010 Pulitzer Prize for Breaking News Photography for a photo showing a construction worker, Jason Oglesbee, attempting to rescue Patricia Ralph-Neely from a flooded river. The Pulitzer Prizes described the photograph as "the heart stopping moment when a rescuer dangling in a makeshift harness tries to save a woman trapped in the foaming water beneath a dam." Attempts to rescue the woman, trapped in the turbulence of water churning underneath a dam had been futile, so Oglesbee wrapped himself in chains and had a construction crane lower him to within reach of the woman. In the photograph, you don't see the woman, but simply her outstretched hand. Ultimately, she was saved.
