= Jim Fitting =

American harmonica player

- Born: San Francisco, California
- Origin: Boston, Massachusetts
- Genre: Rock
- Years active: 1981 – present
- Education: Yale University

Jim Fitting is an American harmonica player based in Boston, Massachusetts. He is known for his work with Treat Her Right, The The, and Session Americana. His credits include guest performances on various other artists' albums and live gigs.

== Background ==
Fitting was born in California and grew up in San Francisco. He began playing harmonica at an early age with his brother Tom on guitar. In the 1970s, he went to Yale University.

== Sex Execs and Fort Apache ==
After graduating, he joined two of his friends from Yale—Sean Slade and Paul Q. Kolderie—in the band Sex Execs, in which Fitting played baritone saxophone.

The trio also helped found Fort Apache Studios in the mid-1980s, along with Joe Harvard.

== Treat Her Right ==
Fitting's playing was prominent in the sound of 1980s/early 1990s Boston quartet Treat Her Right, which featured Mark Sandman. The group's drummer, Billy Conway, was another friend and bandmate from Yale.

In 1988, People magazine called Fitting's harmonica "the pulse of the band." Trouser Press noted that the songs were "all given added juice by Jim Fitting's wailing harp work."

== The The ==
Fitting played with The The in the early to mid-1990s after Treat Her Right broke up. A 1993 account of a show on the Lonely Planet tour called him "a valuable new addition to the band."

A book about this band and its leader, Matt Johnson, observed that Fitting helped draw audience approval with enthusiastic performances.

== Bonnie Raitt ==
He has also accompanied an old friend, Bonnie Raitt, on stage. The Boston Globe noted in 1991 that Fitting was a "special favorite" of Raitt's.

== Coots ==
In 1999, Fitting helped form Coots, which released an album in 2001 called Message from the Seventh Dimension and another called Pray for Rain in 2004. In addition to his harmonica, Fitting was lead vocalist for this band (he had occasionally sung for Treat Her Right).

The lineup, which was notable for the absence of electric guitar, also included drummer Jerome Deupree.

== Session Americana ==
A few years later, he became part of Session Americana, which remains active today. In 2018, a Vermont newspaper, the Times-Argus, described the musical collective and Fitting, "an astoundingly good harmonica player."

He also contributes vocals and songwriting. His songs often link to history.

== Billy, Jimmy, & Dave ==
In 2019, Fitting, Conway, and David Champagne got together and recorded an album. A live date was announced for January 19, 2020 at Club Passim in Cambridge—which was to be their first appearance together on stage since all were members of Treat Her Right. Unfortunately, it was announced that week that Conway would not be able to perform at the event because of health issues. At the event Fitting told the audience Conway had restarted cancer treatment.
