= Let Me Come Over =

1992 studio album by Buffalo Tom

Studio album by Buffalo Tom
- Released: March 10, 1992
- Studio: Dreamland and Fort Apache Studios
- Genre: Alternative rock
- Length: 51:12
- Label: RCA; Situation Two; Beggars Banquet
- Producer: Paul Q. Kolderie; Sean Slade; Buffalo Tom

Buffalo Tom chronology
Birdbrain (1990)	Let Me Come Over (1992)	Big Red Letter Day (1993)

Singles from Let Me Come Over
- 1. "Taillights Fade" Released: 1992; 2. "Velvet Roof" Released: 1992; 3. "Mineral" Released: 1992

Professional ratings
Review scores
Source	Rating
AllMusic	4.5/5 stars
Chicago Tribune	3/4 stars
Los Angeles Times	3/4 stars
Mojo	4/5 stars
NME	8/10
Pitchfork	7.9/10
Q	4/5 stars
Record Collector	4/5 stars
Select	4/5
Uncut	8/10

Let Me Come Over is the third album by American alternative rock band Buffalo Tom. It was released on March 10, 1992, by RCA Records, Situation Two and Beggars Banquet Records.

After two albums co-produced by J Mascis and largely reflecting the hardcore punk scene they emerged from, the band was ready to show off its classic rock influences, with singer-guitarist Bill Janovitz citing "Neil Young, Van Morrison, Bob Dylan, the Stones" and bassist Chris Colbourn crediting "Kinks, Beatles and Stones" as influences; Janovitz would go on to write two books about the Rolling Stones. The band's songwriting was also changed by Colbourn's increasing influence and Janovitz's use of a capo.

Sean Slade, Mascis's co-producer on Birdbrain, returned to produce the album with his long-term collaborator Paul Q. Kolderie and the band. Basic tracks were recorded in three days at Dreamland Recording Studios in Hurley, New York, a converted church described by Janovitz as " a really romantic setting and it lived up to its romanticism". The band then returned to Boston to do overdubs at Fort Apache Studios in Cambridge where their previous albums had been recorded, and of which Slade and Kolderie were co-founders. Initial mixes were done by Slade and Kolderie at the Carriage House in Stamford, Connecticut, with the band encouraging them to emphasize acoustic guitar sounds over electric. The results were "pretty good" and the band "happy-ish" at the time.

While recording was underway, Nirvana's Nevermind had become a hit, with drummer Tom Maginnis leaving the studio to see Nirvana perform at a Boston club the night before the album's release. With the increased commercial potential of "alt rock" led by loud guitars, label Beggars Banquet encouraged the band to agree to a remix by Ron Saint Germain at greater expense than the original cost of recording, in which "the drive of the electric guitars was more important than the high-frequency excitement of the acoustic". Janovitz, who had originally pushed back against the remix and against Saint Germain's bullish personality, was initially "shocked, mostly in a bad way" but also accepted "undeniably how great they were". Colbourn liked the new mixes on first hearing them, and though Slade and Kolderie were shocked to be sidelined, Kolderie accepted that Saint Germain had "solved some of the problems we had trying to mix it in Connecticut". Slade and Kolderie's mix was kept for the song "Frozen Lake".

The cover photo by Michael O'Brien is taken from the February 1988 issue of National Geographic and shows Fred Brown, an Aboriginal Australian stockman. The band received some criticism as "white guys exploiting the black experience" but liked, "in a twisted way", the "off-kilter" feeling created by a cover that did not represent the music on the album.

"Taillights Fade", "Velvet Roof" and "Mineral" were released as singles from the album. The choice of the relatively downbeat "Taillights Fade" was a surprise to Janovitz, who told Louder that "I never thought of it as a stand-out single. It was pretty dark and depressing. It’s basically about being resigned, giving up, feeling older than your years, feeling apart and alienated." Nevertheless it has become a fan favorite, described by Louder as "the anthem for disaffected teens that no Buffalo Tom show would be complete without" and by Drowned in Sound as "probably the song Buffalo Tom are most renowned for.".

For the album's 25th anniversary in 2017, Beggars Banquet released an expanded edition with an extra 10 tracks on vinyl, or 17 on digital versions, recorded live at ULU in 1992.

== Track listing ==
All songs written by Chris Colbourn, Bill Janovitz, and Tom Maginnis.

1. "Staples" – 3:35
2. "Taillights Fade" – 3:44
3. "Mountains of Your Head" – 3:22
4. "Mineral" – 4:32
5. "Darl" – 2:50
6. "Larry" – 5:32
7. "Velvet Roof" – 3:55
8. "I'm Not There" – 4:06
9. "Stymied" – 4:18
10. "Porchlight" – 4:09
11. "Frozen Lake" – 3:45
12. "Saving Grace" – 3:14
13. "Crutch" – 4:03 (Note: Not included on vinyl pressings.)

== Personnel ==
Buffalo Tom

- Chris Colbourn – bass, vocals
- Bill Janovitz – guitar, vocals
- Tom Maginnis – drums

Production

- Sean Slade – production, additional mixing
- Paul Q. Kolderie – production, additional mixing
- Buffalo Tom – production
- Ron Saint Germain – mixing

== Charts ==
Chart (1992)	Peak position
Australian Albums (ARIA Charts)	81
UK Albums (Official Charts Company)	49
