= Fat Tuesday (band) =

Alternative rock band from Minnesota

Background information
- Origin: Minneapolis, Minnesota, U.S.
- Genres: alternative rock; alternative metal
- Years active: 1988–1995
- Labels: Columbia; Red Decibel
- Past members: Andrew Crowley; Michael Provence; Scott Anderson; Scott Kapp; Brian Timm

Fat Tuesday was an American alternative rock band formed in Minneapolis, Minnesota in 1988. Initially founded by front man Andrew Crowley, the band comprised Crowley as a guitarist and vocalist, guitarist Michael Provence, bass guitarist Scott Kapp, and drummer Scott Anderson. The band's first album, So Much More, was popular in the Twin Cities in Minnesota and attracted the attention of record labels leading the band to be signed by Red Decibel Records and Columbia Records.

== Albums on Columbia Records ==
The band recorded and released their first major label album, Califuneral, in 1992. The Buffalo News described the album as "a fierce assault of instruments and vocals". Crowley described the song Thank You & Good Bye as "what toxins and viruses would sound like if they could make music" and Plants and Animals as "something like Sesame Street for senior citizens".

The band's second studio album on the Columbia label was 1993's Everybody's Got One. The band traveled to Cambridge, Massachusetts to record the album at Fort Apache when it was at its Camp Street location above the Rounder Records warehouse. The track High & Low received airplay across the country, and was called a "a sharp, catchy roots-rock track" by Billboard magazine, with "equal parts pop sensibility and noise to separate it from that genre's pack".

Following studio albums Califuneral and Everybody's Got One, the group disbanded in 1995, and its the members pursued other projects.

== Music videos ==
The band created three music videos during their time on the Columbia label. Their first was a music video for the song Califuneral, off of the album by the same name. Their second studio album Everybody's Got One was supported by a video directed by Phil Harder for the song High & Low and follows the band around the Uptown area of Minneapolis. A third music video for the song Winter Storm also was created off the album.

- Califuneral (on Vevo)
- High & Low (on Vevo)
- Winter Storm (on Vevo)
