= Joe Harvard =

American musician (1959–2019)

- Born: Joseph Alia Incagnoli, Jr. January 4, 1959; East Boston, Massachusetts, U.S.
- Died: March 24, 2019 (aged 60); Asbury Park, New Jersey, U.S.
- Education: Harvard University
- Occupations: Musician; singer; writer; record producer
- Musical career
- Years active: 1975–2019

Joseph Incagnoli (1959–2019), better known as Joe Harvard, was an American musician, record producer, and writer, who played a key role in developing the alternative rock scene in Boston, Massachusetts, in the 1980s. He founded Fort Apache Studios, along with Sean Slade, Paul Q. Kolderie, and Jim Fitting.

Joseph Alia Incagnoli, Jr. grew up in the Jeffries Point neighborhood of East Boston. He earned a scholarship to Harvard University, which became the source of his alias while working in a Cambridge, Massachusetts, record store. Varying accounts from musicians Claudia Gonson and Rich Gilbert are also visible in a history of the Pixies. Gonson held that Incagnoli gave himself the nickname to emphasize in a self-deprecating way that he was a true local (she noted his broad Boston accent). Gilbert said that friends gave it to Incagnoli as a playful dig at his working-class roots.

Incagnoli studied Archaeological Anthropology and graduated cum laude. He worked as assistant to the director of the Peabody Museum and took part in a comprehensive survey of Saudi Arabia. However, he decided that his true calling lay in playing and recording music. Joe played with Ava Electris in a band called "Ava and the Teazers", but decided to leave the band and taking the drummer Rich Maddalo and bassist Bob Salvi with him. Dave Pederson joined Joe and the band "the Bones" was formed in 1979/1980. By establishing Fort Apache in the mid-1980s (he later briefly became sole owner), he helped lay the foundation for the success of bands such as the Pixies, the Lemonheads, Dinosaur Jr., Morphine, Buffalo Tom, and Throwing Muses. He won the WFNX/Boston Phoenix Best Local Producer award in 1989. As co-founder of Helldorado Productions, he was also instrumental in bringing live rock music to The Middle East nightclub in Cambridge.

Incagnoli moved to Asbury Park, New Jersey, in 2001 and became an important part of the town's cultural scene and revival. In 2004, he authored the book The Velvet Underground & Nico for the 33⅓ series focusing on seminal albums.

Incagnoli began to build an encyclopedic website, Rock in Boston, in 1996. It contained a trove of information on and photographs of Boston bands, in particular from the punk rock and new wave music scenes. The site came down in 2004 but was relaunched in 2014 as Boston Rock Storybook. Although Incagnoli was not able to rebuild it fully before his death from liver cancer on March 24, 2019, the original is still accessible.
