= Smitten (Buffalo Tom album) =

Studio album by Buffalo Tom
- Released: September 29, 1998
- Recorded: December 1997 – January 1998
- Genre: Alternative rock
- Length: 50:03
- Label: Beggars Banquet/Polydor
- Producer: David Bianco & Buffalo Tom

Buffalo Tom chronology
Sleepy Eyed (1995)	Smitten (1998)	Three Easy Pieces (2007)

Professional ratings
Review scores
Source	Rating
AllMusic	2/5 stars

Smitten is the sixth album by Buffalo Tom. It was their only album for Polydor Records.

Singer/guitarist Bill Janovitz said that, as the band members looked over demos in preparation for the album, they noticed that keyboards were taking a larger role in their songs than before. Early in the process of putting the album together, the band spent time working with guitarist/keyboardist Tom Gorman, most well known as a member of Belly. Gorman pointed out that the band would probably be better served by a traditional keyboardist. Gorman was replaced by Phil Aiken after Janovitz spied his classified ad in a local weekly.

The album was produced by David Bianco, who was sought out by the band after being impressed by his work with Teenage Fanclub.

== Track listing ==
1. "Rachael" - 3:00
2. "Postcard" - 5:02
3. "Knot in It" - 5:23
4. "The Bible" - 4:31
5. "Scottish Windows" - 4:19
6. "White Paint Morning" - 3:17
7. "Wiser" - 4:54
8. "See to Me" - 2:57
9. "Register Side" - 4:16
10. "Do You In" - 4:45
11. "Under Milk Wood" - 3:50
12. "Walking Wounded" - 3:49

All songs by Buffalo Tom.

== Personnel ==
Buffalo Tom

- Bill Janovitz - vocals, guitar
- Chris Colbourn - bass
- Tom Maginnis - drums

== Charts ==
Chart (1998)	Peak position
Australian Albums (ARIA Charts)	85
