= Sex Execs =

- Origin: Boston, Massachusetts
- Genre: New wave
- Years active: 1981–1984
- Label: Unsigned
- Past members: Walter Clay; Sean Slade; Paul Kolderie; Jim Fitting; Russ Gershon; Andrew "Andre" Barnaby; Ted Pine; Dan Johnsen; Jerome Deupree

Sex Execs were a new wave music band from Boston, Massachusetts, active from late 1981 to mid-1984, playing bars and colleges in the Northeast. Although the group's recorded output was scanty and self-released, lasting recognition came via several notable members. The band's home studio marked the formative experience of producers Paul Q. Kolderie (bass) and Sean Slade (rhythm guitar). Other members included Jim Fitting (who played saxophone for Sex Execs but became better known on harmonica), drummer Jerome Deupree (later of Morphine), and saxophonist Russ Gershon.

== History ==
=== Style and Reception ===
Sex Execs also achieved popularity on college radio, especially with the single "My Ex." However, the closest the band came to breaking out to wider recognition was in 1983, thanks to the fifth annual Rock 'n' Roll Rumble, sponsored by WBCN (FM) radio. After beating the Del Fuegos in the semi-finals, they finished as runner-up to 'Til Tuesday. The Boston Globe called both finalists "style conscious" and referred to Sex Execs as "witty" and "wry". The article also cited how one judge was impressed by their tight ensemble playing of complicated arrangements and by the persona of frontman Walter Clay. Yet whereas 'Til Tuesday's performance held the promise that would eventually earn a major-label deal, Sex Execs were viewed as short on songs. They were, however, called "slick, stylish, and tight," with frequent bursts of brass as part of their busy arrangements. (By then the combo had expanded from six to eight members with the addition of two horn players.) With the suits and ties that they sported on stage, the band was akin to Robert Palmer, who happened to be on hand for that Rumble final.

Previously, the Boston Globe had referred to Sex Execs' penchant for "overeducated in-jokes" while also praising them as an interesting band that explored and trashed many styles, including covers of Hayley Mills' "Let's Get Together" and Annette Funicello's "Jo Jo the Dog Faced Boy". Their originals were described as ranging from basic pop to a jazzy dissonance.

Rock journalist Dave Marsh had a pithy description of the "concept funk" song "Sex Train": "David Byrne flashing a hard-on."

=== Legacy in production ===
In a 2015 interview, Paul Kolderie talked about how he first began to learn about recording in the Dorchester, Boston house where most of the Sex Execs lived. It was wired up as a primitive studio, and other bands came over to record as well. As Sex Execs became more successful, they started recording in professional studios such as Syncro Sound, which was owned by The Cars. Kolderie learned a lot from the engineers there.

Three years later, Sean Slade echoed Kolderie in an interview during which he discussed their career as producers and how it got started at the Sex Execs' house with a four-track reel-to-reel recorder they'd bought in New York.

Kolderie, Slade, and Fitting -- who were all alumni of Yale University -- then went on to found Fort Apache Studios, which continued the "do it yourself" approach they'd espoused with Sex Execs. The other founder, Joe Harvard, said that Fitting became the fourth principal because it was easier to divide the bills by four. Harvard described them as "the most grossly overeducated recording crew in the history of the world."

== Personnel ==
- Walter Clay – lead vocals
- Sean Slade – guitar, saxophone, vocals
- Paul Kolderie – bass
- Jim Fitting – baritone saxophone
- Russ Gershon – saxophone
- Andrew "Andre" Barnaby – guitar
- Ted Pine – keyboards, vocals
- Dan Johnsen – drums
- Jerome Deupree – drums (replaced Johnsen)

== Recordings ==
- Sex Execs (1982) - four-song EP
- "My Ex" / "Ladies' Man" (1983) - 12-inch single
- "Sex Train" / "Strange Things" (1984) – 12-inch single
