= Jerome Lowenstein =

American nephrologist, editor and author

Jerome Lowenstein (January 25, 1933 – December 8, 2025) was an American medical doctor specializing in nephrology, the specialty related to kidneys, in New York City. He received his M.D. from New York University in 1957. He continued to work at New York University as a professor of medicine in the Division of Nephrology, as Firm Chief in the NYU School of Medicine, as a clinician in several clinical practices in New York, as a researcher, and also as an author. He was also the founding Nonfiction Editor for Bellevue Literary Review. He developed a program at NYU for Humanistic Aspects of Medical Education which he directed.

== Biography ==
Lowenstein was born in the Bronx, New York City, on January 25, 1933. He did pre-med studies at New York University, receiving a bachelor's degree in 1953, and graduated from the N.Y.U. College of Medicine in 1957. After an internship at Montefiore Hospital in the Bronx, studies in gerontology at the National Institutes of Health in Baltimore, and a residency at Bellevue Hospital, he returned to N.Y.U. in 1963. He helped establish Bellevue Literary Review in 2000 and was its nonfiction editor for 20 years. From 2007 he was founding publisher of the Bellevue Literary Press, a publishing house dedicated to literary fiction and nonfiction at the intersection of the arts and sciences. Lowenstein died on December 8, 2025, at his home in Manhattan, at the age of 92.

== Publications ==
During his medical and research career he conducted many clinical trials and extensive research in several topics in medicine. He also published a novel. As of 2019, his faculty web page listed 92 publications by him. A selection follows:

=== Journals ===
- Etinger A, Kumar SR, Ackley W, Soiefer L, Chun J, Singh P, Grossman E, Matalon A, Holzman RS, Meijers B, Lowenstein J (2018). "The effect of isohydric hemodialysis on the binding and removal of uremic retention solutes". PLOS ONE. 13 (2) e0192770. Bibcode:2018PLoSO..1392770E. doi:10.1371/journal.pone.0192770. PMC 5823377. PMID 29470534.
- Etinger A, Kumar SR, Ackley W, Soiefer L, Chun J, Singh P, Grossman E, Matalon A, Holzman RS, Meijers B, Lowenstein J (2018). "Correction: The effect of isohydric hemodialysis on the binding and removal of uremic retention solutes". PLOS ONE. 13 (7) e0200980. Bibcode:2018PLoSO..1300980E. doi:10.1371/journal.pone.0200980. PMC 6047821. PMID 30011331.
- Nazzal L, Roberts J, Singh P, Jhawar S, Matalon A, Gao Z, Holzman R, Liebes L, Blaser MJ, Lowenstein J (November 2017). "Microbiome perturbation by oral vancomycin reduces plasma concentration of two gut-derived uremic solutes, indoxyl sulfate and p-cresyl sulfate, in end-stage renal disease". Nephrology, Dialysis, Transplantation. 32 (11): 1809–1817. doi:10.1093/ndt/gfx029. PMID 28379433.
- Lowenstein J, Grantham JJ (March 2017). "Residual renal function: a paradigm shift". Kidney International. 91 (3): 561–565. doi:10.1016/j.kint.2016.09.052. PMID 28202171.
- Lowenstein J, Grantham JJ (June 2016). "The rebirth of interest in renal tubular function". American Journal of Physiology. Renal Physiology. 310 (11): F1351-5. doi:10.1152/ajprenal.00055.2016. PMID 26936872.
- Kimmel PL, Neugarten J, Lowenstein J (March 2015). "David S. Baldwin, MD: a legacy in nephrology". Journal of the American Society of Nephrology. 26 (3): 531–5. doi:10.1681/ASN.2014030305. PMC 4341485. PMID 25150155.

=== Books ===
As of 2019 Amazon listed three books by him:

- Lowenstein J, Markel H, Stern AM (March 1997). The Midnight Meal and other essays about Doctors, Patients, and medicine. Yale University Press. ISBN 978-0-300-06816-0.
- Lowenstein J (2010). Henderson's Equation. Gadd Books. ISBN 978-0-88427-903-7.
- Lowenstein J (2007). Acid and basics: a guide to understanding acid-base disorders. BookSurge Publishing/amazon.com Company. ISBN 978-1-4196-6485-4.
