= Premio Fernanda Pivano =

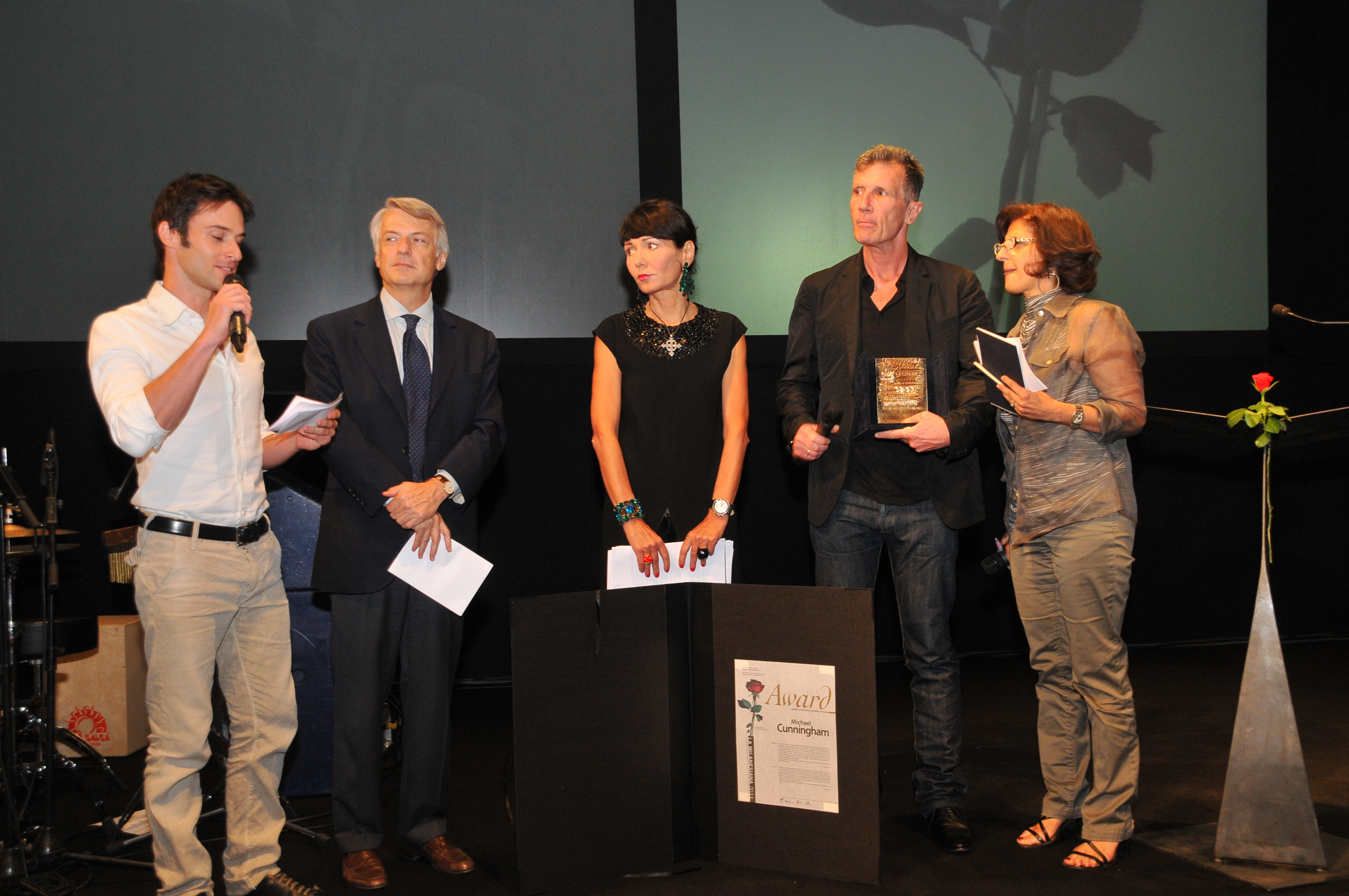
Fernanda Pivano Award 2011, Italy - Enrico Rotelli, Ferruccio de Bortoli, Elisabetta Sgarbi, Michael Cunningham, Lidia Zanardi

The Fernanda Pivano Award for American Literature is an Italian literary award for American authors. It is named in honor of Fernanda Pivano.

The Fernanda Pivano Award represents the work of spreading American literature that Pivano undertook in Italy. The beginning of her literary journey dates back to 1943, with the publication of the first translation of the Spoon River Anthology by Edgar Lee Masters.

Since 2009, the Award took over the specific objective of promoting the works of American writers in Italy.

Year	Winners
2009	Erica Jong
2010	Joyce Carol Oates
2011	Michael Cunningham
2012	Rick Moody, Paul Harding
2013	Michael Chabon
2014	Andrew Sean Greer
2015	Jonathan Galassi
