= This Other Eden (Harding novel) =

2023 novel by Paul Harding

- Author: Paul Harding
- Language: English
- Publication date: 2023

This Other Eden is a 2023 novel by American writer Paul Harding.

== Background ==
The novel presents a fictionalized version of Maine's Malaga Island, dubbed "Apple Island" in the book. It's based on the historical record of when "Maine forcibly removed all residents of a mixed-race fishing community on a small island off the coast of Phippsburg in 1912."

Harding began the earliest version of the novel by writing a scene featuring Mrs. Hale, a character from his novel Enon. In the scene, Mrs. Hale and members of her family sit in a meadow, and observe an unknown person, inspired by a Charles Ethan Porter painting.

== Reception ==
Danez Smith, in a review published by The New York Times, praised Harding's prose. In a review published by the Financial Times, Catherine Taylor also praised Harding's writing.

Writing for The Los Angeles Times, Mark Athitakis compared the book unfavorably to Harding's previous works. Athitakis also wrote that Harding's writing was "fussed over".

Some historians and those with family ties to the island claimed the novel includes harmful myths about the island's residents that historians have tried to correct.

== Awards ==
Year	Award	Category	Result	Ref.
2023	Booker Prize	—	Shortlisted	
2023	National Book Award	Fiction	Finalist	
2024	Chautauqua Prize	—	Shortlisted	
2024	International Dublin Literary Award	—	Longlisted	
2024	Mark Twain American Voice in Literature Award	—	Finalist	
