= Tinkers (novel) =

2009 novel by Paul Harding

- First edition hardcover
- Author: Paul Harding
- Language: English
- Genre: Novel
- Publisher: Bellevue Literary Press
- Publication date: January 1, 2009
- Publication place: United States
- Media type: Print (hardcover), e-book
- Pages: 191 pp.
- ISBN: 978-1934137192 (hardcover)

Tinkers is a 2009 first novel by American author Paul Harding. The novel tells the stories of George Washington Crosby, an elderly clock repairman, and of his father, Howard. On his deathbed, George remembers his father, who was a tinker selling household goods from a donkey-drawn cart and who struggled with epilepsy. The novel was published by Bellevue Literary Press, a sister organization of the Bellevue Literary Review.

Tinkers won the 2010 Pulitzer Prize for Fiction, among other awards and honors. The Pulitzer board called the novel "a powerful celebration of life in which a New England father and son, through suffering and joy, transcend their imprisoning lives and offer new ways of perceiving the world and mortality."

== Plot ==
Tinkers follows George Crosby in the days before he dies, reliving his childhood memories. The book takes the reader through both George's life as well as his father's, Howard, who sells home goods from a wagon in New England. The reader learns about George's skill at fixing clocks, which becomes a metaphor for life's beauty as well as its fragility. It is about Howard's struggle with epilepsy as well as his own relationship with his father, who was a minister who fell ill when Howard was a boy. It is a novel that is not only about death, but the gift of simple pleasures of nature and being in the world. It is about fathers and sons, solitude and connection.

== Reviews ==
The Los Angeles Times praised "a writer [who] describes something so well—snow, oranges, dirt—that you can smell it or feel it or sense it in the room." The New Yorker enjoyed Harding's "skillful evocation [and] mosaic of memories". The Boston Globe called the novel a "poignant exploration of where we may journey when the clock has barely a tick or two left and we really can't go anywhere at all." The New York Times failed to review the novel before the Pulitzer Prize announcement, noting that it was the first novel since A Confederacy of Dunces in 1981 to come from a small publisher and win that award.

== Awards and honors ==
=== Awards ===
Year	Award	Category	Result	Ref.
2009	Center for Fiction First Novel Prize	—	Shortlisted	
2009	Los Angeles Times Book Prize	First Fiction	Finalist	
2010	PEN/Robert W. Bingham Prize	—	Won	
2010	Pulitzer Prize	Fiction	Won	
2011	International Dublin Literary Award	—	Longlisted	

=== Honors ===
- 2010 Best Novels of 2009 by Publishers Weekly and Amazon.com
- 2010 Best Books of 2009 by NPR and the Library Journal

== Editions ==
- Tinkers, New York: Bellevue Literary Press, 2009. ISBN 9781934137192 (hardcover)
- Tinkers, New York: HarperCollins, 2009 (international edition). ISBN 9781554689866 (paperback)
- Tinkers, New York: Bellevue Literary Press, 2019 (10th anniversary edition). ISBN 9781942658603 (paperback)
