= Tied to the Tracks (album) =

Studio album by Treat Her Right
- Released: 1989
- Genre: Blues, country, rockabilly
- Label: RCA
- Producer: Don Gehman, Bob Holmes

Treat Her Right chronology
| Treat Her Right (1986) | Tied to the Tracks (1989) | What's Good for You (1991) |

Tied to the Tracks is the second album by the American band Treat Her Right, released in 1989. The band supported the album by touring with Guadalcanal Diary as well as the Replacements. The first single was "Picture of the Future".

== Production ==
Produced primarily by Don Gehman, the album was recorded live, with only minimal overdubbing. Treat Her Right was influenced by Muddy Waters, whose records led them to rethink their sound. The band's philosophy was to subtract musical embellishment to songs rather than add them; they also did not enjoy the recording process. Mark Sandman employed an octave divider to make his guitar sound similar to a bass. Much of the percussion came from cocktail drum, tambourine, and wood block. The band had written 20 songs over the previous two years; they recorded all of them and then chose 12 for the album. "No Reason" is about the arbitrariness of vehicular crashes and other accidents; it was inspired by a stabbing incident involving Sandman. "Junkyard" is partly about Sandman's habit of filling his apartment with stuff he collected on garbage days. "Hit a Man" is a cover of Captain Beefheart's "Nowadays a Woman's Gotta Hit a Man". "Marie" is about a man who regrets not proposing marriage to an old flame.

== Critical reception ==
Professional ratings
Review scores
| Source | Rating |
|---|---|
| AllMusic | 4/5 stars |
| The Arizona Republic | 4/4 stars |
| Omaha World-Herald | 3.5/5 stars |
| The Ottawa Citizen | 4/5 stars |
| Record-Journal | B− |
| The Tampa Tribune | 3/4 stars |

The Boston Globe opined that the band "excels at a neoprimitive blues that skips across genres, but owes mostly to the early, lowdown Chicago sound of Howlin' Wolf and Muddy Waters." The St. Petersburg Times said that Treat Her Right "brings a forward-looking sensibility to the blues base of Tied to the Tracks... The band has taken a bunch of simple, and in some cases undistinguished, songs and dressed them up in such an enticing way that they become nearly irresistible." The San Diego Union-Tribune stated that the band "sort of plays blues, sort of plays country, sort of plays swamp rhythms and sort of plays rock... The mixture is as enchanting as it is eclectic."

The Province noted that the lyrics are "loaded with menace and desperation and hipster cool and ironic humor." The Morning Call dubbed the band "the cool, urban hipster cousins of Creedence Clearwater Revival". The Ottawa Citizen said that "the style may be primitive, but not reckless and certainly not tuneless." Trouser Press called Tied to the Tracks "stylish and self-assured". Spin stated that the band's "sense of nuance and mood is superb". The Press of Atlantic City considered Treat Her Right a "Martian blues/rock band". The Record-Journal labeled the album "Southern rock gone 'lite' for the [']80s".

== Track listing ==
| No. | Title | Length |
|---|---|---|
| 1. | "Junkyard" |
| 2. | "Picture of the Future" |
| 3. | "Marie" |
| 4. | "Big Medicine" |
| 5. | "Hit a Man" |
| 6. | "No Reason" |
| 7. | "Back Door" |
| 8. | "Tied to the Tracks" |
| 9. | "Hank" |
| 10. | "Taboo" |
| 11. | "King of Beers" |
| 12. | "Back to Sin City" |
