= Paul Harding (author) =

American musician and author (born 1967)

- Born: 1967 (age 58–59)
- Education: University of Massachusetts, Amherst (BA); University of Iowa (MFA)
- Occupation: Novelist
- Writing career
- Genre: Literary fiction
- Notable work: Tinkers (2009)
- Notable awards: 2010 Pulitzer Prize for Fiction; 2010 PEN/Robert W. Bingham Prize
- Website: www.paulhardingauthor.com

Paul Harding (born 1967) is an American musician and author. He is best known for his debut novel, Tinkers, which won the 2010 Pulitzer Prize for Fiction and the 2010 PEN/Robert W. Bingham Prize, among other honors. He is currently a Distinguished Professor of Creative Writing at Emerson College.

== Early life and education ==
Harding grew up on the North Shore of the Boston area in the town of Wenham, Massachusetts. In his youth, he spent a lot of time "knocking about in the woods," to which he attributes his love of nature. His grandfather repaired clocks, and he apprenticed under him, an experience that found its way into his first novel, Tinkers.

He has a B.A. in English from the University of Massachusetts Amherst and an MFA in Writing from the Iowa Writers' Workshop.

== Career ==
After graduating from the University of Massachusetts, he spent time touring with his band Cold Water Flat in the US and Europe. He had always been a heavy reader, and recalls reading Carlos Fuentes' Terra Nostra and thinking "this is what I want to do." In that book, Harding "saw the entire world, all of history." When he next had time off from touring with the band he signed up for a summer writing class at Skidmore College in New York. His teacher was Marilynne Robinson, and through her he learned about the Iowa Writers' Workshop writing program. There, he studied with Barry Unsworth, Elizabeth McCracken, and later Robinson. At some point, he realized some of the people he admired most were "profoundly religious," so he spent years reading theology and was "deeply" influenced by Karl Barth and John Calvin. He considers himself a "self-taught modern New England transcendentalist."

Musically, Harding admires jazz drummers and considers John Coltrane's drummer, Elvin Jones, the greatest. Harding was the drummer in the band Cold Water Flat throughout its existence from 1990 to 1996.

Harding's second novel, Enon (2013), concerns characters from his first novel, Tinkers, looking at the lives of George Crosby's grandson, Charlie Crosby, and his daughter Kate.

His third novel, This Other Eden, was published in 2023. It was shortlisted for the 2023 Booker Prize and the 2023 National Book Award for Fiction.

He has taught writing at Harvard University and the University of Iowa. Previously, Harding was the director of the Creative Writing and Literature MFA program at Stony Brook Southampton, as well as interim associate provost of Stony Brook University's Lichtenstein Center. In September 2024, Harding began teaching in the Department of Writing, Literature and Publishing at Emerson College, where he is a Distinguished Professor of Creative Writing.

== Personal life ==
Harding lives near Boston with his wife and two sons.

== Awards and honors ==
Year	Title	Award	Category	Result	Ref.
2009	Tinkers	Center for Fiction First Novel Prize	—	Shortlisted	
2009	Tinkers	Los Angeles Times Book Prize	First Fiction	Finalist	
2010	Tinkers	PEN/Robert W. Bingham Prize	—	Won	
2010	Tinkers	Pulitzer Prize	Fiction	Won	
2011	Tinkers	International Dublin Literary Award	—	Longlisted	
2012	—	Fernanda Pivano Award	—	Won	
2014	Enon	Andrew Carnegie Medals for Excellence	Fiction	Longlisted	
2014	Enon	Jan Michalski Prize	—	First Selection	
2014	Enon	Maine Readers' Choice Award	—	Longlisted	
2023	This Other Eden	Booker Prize	—	Shortlisted	
2023	This Other Eden	National Book Award	Fiction	Finalist	
2024	This Other Eden	Chautauqua Prize	—	Shortlisted	
2024	This Other Eden	International Dublin Literary Award	—	Longlisted	
2024	This Other Eden	Mark Twain American Voice in Literature Award	—	Finalist	

== Works ==
- —— (2009). Tinkers. Bellevue Literary Press. ISBN 9781934137123.
- —— (2013). Enon. Random House. ISBN 9781400069439.
- —— (2023). This Other Eden. W. W. Norton & Company. ISBN 9781324036296.
