= Lizard Lounge =

Nightclub in Cambridge, Massachusetts

Coordinates: 42°22′55.6″N 71°7′10.3″W

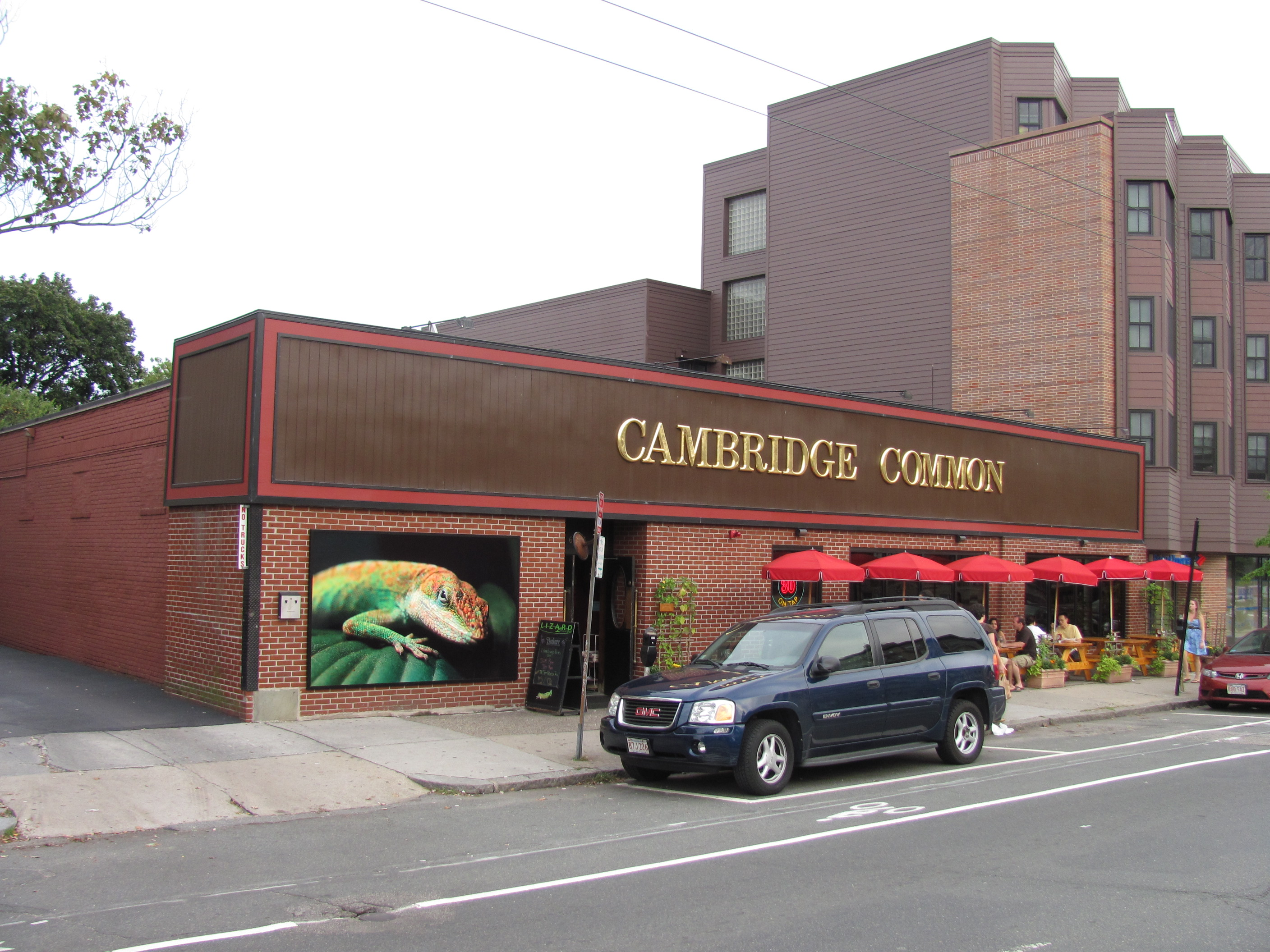
Lizard Lounge

The Lizard Lounge is a nightclub situated on Massachusetts Avenue between Harvard Square and Porter Square in Cambridge, Massachusetts. It is below the restaurant Cambridge Common. A small basement bar, it is known for the musicians it hosts. The owners also own Cambridge Common. They carry a large selection of beers, including many local ones such as those made at Cambridge Brewing Company.

The Lizard Lounge hosts rock, blues, and jazz performances. It hosts two bands year round, Session Americana and Club D'Elf. The bar has been open since 1996.
