= Bellevue Literary Press =

American publisher

- Founded: 2007
- Founder: Jerome Lowenstein, M.D. Erika Goldman
- Country of origin: United States
- Headquarters location: New York, New York
- Distribution: Consortium Book Sales & Distribution
- Key people: Erika Goldman (Publisher and Editorial Director)
- Publication types: Books
- Nonfiction topics: popular-science nonfiction
- Fiction genres: literary fiction
- Official website: www.blpress.org

Bellevue Literary Press (BLP) is an American publisher. It was founded in 2007 as a sister organization of Bellevue Literary Review, located at Bellevue Hospital in New York City. Its founding publisher was Jerome Lowenstein. It became an independent nonprofit in 2018.

According to their website, "[Bellevue Literary Press] is the first and only nonprofit press dedicated to literary fiction and nonfiction at the intersection of the arts and sciences." Despite being a small press that publishes only a handful of titles per year, BLP garnered a Pulitzer Prize in 2010 for Tinkers by Paul Harding. The New York Times abashedly admitted that it failed to review the novel when it was first published, noting that Tinkers was the first novel from a small press to win a Pulitzer since A Confederacy of Dunces in 1981.

BLP gained more attention in 2011 when The Sojourn by Andrew Krivak became a finalist for the National Book Award for Fiction. BLP has published books written by the likes of Eduardo Halfon, Jonathan D. Moreno, Jerome Charyn, Paul Lockhart, and Melissa Pritchard, among others.

== See also ==
- List of English-language book publishing companies
- List of English-language small presses
- List of English-language literary presses
