= Sean Slade =

American record producer

- Born: 14 November 1957 (age 68); Lansing, Michigan, United States
- Genres: Alternative rock
- Occupation(s): Recording engineer, record producer
- Years active: 1978-present

Sean Slade (born 14 November 1957) is an American record producer, engineer, and mixer. On many of his productions he worked in partnership with Paul Q. Kolderie.

== Career ==
Slade was born in Lansing, Michigan, United States. He graduated from Yale University in 1978. Slade and Kolderie became friends at Yale, where they played in bands together. They both later relocated to Boston, where they became members of Sex Execs, a new wave music band of the early 1980s. The duo had their formative experience as producers while they were in Sex Execs. Most of the group lived in a house in Dorchester, Boston that was wired up as a primitive studio. In a 2018 interview, Slade discussed how their career as producers got started at that house with a four-track reel-to-reel recorder they had bought in New York.

Other bands came over to record as well, including a local act called Three Colors, which featured saxophonist Dana Colley, later of Morphine. As Sex Execs became more successful, they started recording in professional studios such as Syncro Sound, which was owned by The Cars. As Kolderie recalled, they learned a lot from the engineers there.

In 1985, Slade and Kolderie co-founded Boston's Fort Apache Studios, along with Jim Fitting (another friend from Yale and Sex Execs) and Joe Harvard. The studio originated in Roxbury, but later relocated to Cambridge, Massachusetts. "We were all a part of that DIY kind of culture," said Slade. "The whole idea of getting someone in to design [the studio] wasn’t part of the plan. The plan was, 'Get a control room, get a playing room, get the wiring right, get a console, and then just start recording'."

Slade remained active as a musician in the 1980s. He played rhythm guitar and occasionally sang and wrote songs for the Boston indie band Men & Volts, which also included Kolderie.

Slade and Kolderie co-produced Radiohead's debut album, Pablo Honey, which was released 1993. They were pivotal in convincing EMI Records to release "Creep" as the band's debut single prior to the album's release. The song initially failed to achieve commercial success, but after the album release in early 1993, "Creep" was re-released and became a worldwide hit.

Slade has produced and/or mixed recordings by such artists as Hole, Warren Zevon, Pixies, The Lemonheads, Juliana Hatfield, Morphine, Big Dipper, Dinosaur Jr., HumanKind, Uncle Tupelo, Tracy Bonham, Spacehog, the Mighty Mighty Bosstones, Suddenly, Tammy!, Lou Reed, The Boo Radleys, New Collisions, Sebadoh, Lush, the Go-Go's, The Dictators, Beth Sorrentino, Weezer, Kim Boekbinder, The Dresden Dolls, Echobelly, Buffalo Tom, and Papas Fritas.

He co-produced (with Kolderie) Hole's Live Through This, which went platinum within a year of its release and spawned four singles.

Slade is an Associate Professor of Music Production and Engineering at the Berklee College of Music.
