= Fort Apache Studios =

Recording studio in New England

Fort Apache Studios is a New England recording studio focusing on alternative rock sessions produced there since 1986. It is currently located in New Hampshire.

== History ==
The studio was initially built by a collective begun in 1985 by musician/producer Joe Harvard and members of a band called Sex Execs: engineers Paul Q. Kolderie, Sean Slade, and Jim Fitting.

Its first location was 169 Norfolk Avenue, a warehouse in the Roxbury neighborhood of Boston, Massachusetts. As Bill Janovitz of Buffalo Tom noted, it was the height of the crack epidemic, and Roxbury was a dangerous place. As a result, Harvard gave the studio its name after the 1981 movie Fort Apache, The Bronx, which was set in a crime-ridden neighborhood.

The team took a do-it-yourself approach. Drummer Billy Conway, Fitting's bandmate in Treat Her Right, framed the control room wall. The studio became very active recording Boston-area indie-rock groups in 1986. It soon upgraded its early 8-track Roxbury facilities to 16-track equipment.

Fort Apache relocated its facilities above the Rounder Records warehouse and offices on Camp Street in Cambridge, Massachusetts in 1988. Around then, Harvard briefly became sole owner; producer Gary Smith joined the studio at that time, later becoming a partner in the company and sole owner when it moved to Vermont.

In 1995, a larger studio was built a block away, on Edmunds Street in Cambridge, Massachusetts. In 2002, the company moved the studio from Massachusetts into space leased in an old hotel called The Windham, in Bellows Falls, Vermont. In 2007 operations in Bellows Falls were suspended and Smith moved the studio and management offices to his farm nearby in New Hampshire. Smith passed away in 2023.

=== "Fort Apache" as a business name ===
Smith used "Fort Apache" as the name of a multi-faceted company that operated the studio business, a concert promotion business, and a business managing artists such as Juliana Hatfield, Tanya Donelly and Natalie Merchant. From 2002-2006, Fort Apache additionally operated a music venue in the lobby of The Windham Hotel, where it recorded and broadcast nearly 200 live concerts. The concert venue was originally the brainchild of Smith and Charlie Hunter, owner of the Bellows Falls booking agency Flying Under Radar. In 2007, operations in Bellows Falls were suspended and Smith moved the studio and management offices to his farm nearby in New Hampshire.

=== Artists ===
Among the many major groups and artists who have recorded there over the years are Pixies, Radiohead, Rubyhorse, Superdrag, Come, Big Dipper, Juliana Hatfield, Throwing Muses, Belly, Tanya Donelly, Dinosaur Jr., Sebadoh, The Lemonheads, Volcano Suns, The Mighty Mighty Bosstones, Elliott Smith, Eleventh Dream Day, The Connells, The Specials, Blake Babies, Weezer, Yo La Tengo, Evan Dando, Warren Zevon, Dirt Merchants, Fat Tuesday Toys Went Berserk, The Shods, Spore, Blameless, Uncle Tupelo, Morphine, Superchunk and many more. The Bridge: A Tribute to Neil Young contains recordings of Pixies and Dinosaur Jr. recorded at Fort Apache.

== Affiliated Producers ==
Producers affiliated with the studio in the 1980s and 1990s included Lou Giordano, studio manager Gary Smith, Sean Slade, Paul Q Kolderie, Tim O'Heir and Matthew Ellard. Smith brought the Pixies to Fort Apache to record their legendary 1987 demos later known as The Purple Tape and also produced several of Throwing Muses' 1980s albums there. Smith became a co-owner of the studio when it was moved to its 24-track Cambridge facilities in 1988. Eventually, in the 1990s, Harvard sold his ownership interests in the studio to partners Smith and Billy Bragg and departed. Fort Apache also hosted a recording label in partnership with MCA Records in the mid-1990s.

== History By Location ==
=== Norfolk Avenue 1985 to 1987 ===
42.3258°N 71.0701°W

Smith brought the Pixies in to record their 1987 demos Pixies (EP) later known as The Purple Tape. Smith also produced several of Throwing Muses' albums.

=== Camp Street 1987 to 2003 ===
42.3984°N 71.1303°W

The Camp Street location was above the Rounder Records warehouse and offices on Camp Street in Cambridge, Massachusetts. Records made in this location include Hole's Live Through This (1994), Radiohead's Pablo Honey (1993), Radiohead's The Bends (1995), Dinosaur Jr.s Green Mind, Fat Tuesday's Everybody's Got One and Buffalo Tom's Let Me Come Over (1992).

=== Camp Street 2003 to 2010 ===
Grammy-winning producer Paul Kolderie continued to operate this studio under the Business Name "Camp Street." His most recent works include the 2014 Grammy-Nominated DELLA MAE record, the first new record in a decade by The Dismemberment Plan, as well as new records from Speedy Ortiz, Mike Gordon, Mark Mulcahy, and Yellow Ostrich.

=== Edmunds Street 1995 to 2003 ===
42.3984°N 71.1324°W

The second location was opened in 1995 was a short walk across Mass Ave to Edmunds Street. The Edmunds street location used the same architectural plans as the Camp Street locations so that mixes could be worked on in both places. The Edmunds Street location featured a performance studio with a stage and 18' high ceilings. This improved space made it possible to record huge drum sounds like those heard on Oceanic. The Edmunds Street studio also opened the opportunity to host live concerts for the radio with artists like David Bowie, Beck, The Mighty Mighty Bosstones, Dinosaur Jr, Goo Goo Dolls and Radiohead. Recordings from the first series of concerts can be found on the album This is Fort Apache (1995).

=== Bellows Falls, VT 2002 to 2007 ===
43.1339°N 72.4440°W

In 2002 Gary Smith, who by then was sole owner of the company, moved the studio from Massachusetts to Bellows Falls, VT, while continuing to operate it under the famous Fort Apache Studios name as well. Since then, Paul Kolderie and Sean Slade have continued to run the original Fort Apache studio location under the name Camp Street Studios. For fifteen years, Smith used "Fort Apache" as the name of a multi-faceted company that operated the studio business, a concert promotion business, and a business managing artists such as Juliana Hatfield, Tanya Donelly and Natalie Merchant. From 2002-2006, Fort Apache additionally operated a music venue in the lobby of The Windham Hotel, where it recorded and broadcast nearly 200 live concerts. The concert venue was originally the brainchild of Smith and Charlie Hunter, owner of the Bellows Falls booking agency Flying Under Radar.

=== Edmunds Street 2008 to Present ===
42.3984°N 71.1324°W

In 2008, The Bridge Sound & Stage began opened for business at the Edmunds Street location. The engineers at The Bridge are Owen Curtin and Janos Fulop. AR Classic Records is also run out of this location. Among the artists recording and performing in this location are Amanda Palmer, Sheryl Crow, David Gray, Keene, Slaine, Ed O.G., Jordan Knight, Moe Pope, Jared Evan, Duck Down Music Inc., Sean Price, Termanology, Slane, Monkey Knife Fight and many more.
