= Treat Her Right =

American rock group

- Origin: Boston, Massachusetts, United States
- Genres: Blues rock; roots rock
- Years active: 1985–1991, 2009–2011
- Labels: RCA Records, Rounder Records
- Past members: Mark Sandman (died 1999); David Champagne; Jim Fitting; Billy Conway (died 2021); Steve Mayone; Billy Beard

Treat Her Right was an American rock group, formed in Boston, Massachusetts, United States, in 1985. The band originally featured Mark Sandman on "low guitar", Billy Conway on cocktail drum, David Champagne on guitar and Jim Fitting on harmonica. Singing and songwriting duties were shared by all but Conway. Champagne and Fitting reformed the band in 2009 with new members Steve Mayone and Billy Beard.

Treat Her Right was the forerunner to the successful indie rock band Morphine. Critic Ira Robbins described Treat Her Right as "[n]ot quite a blues band, not exactly swamp trash and too stylized for basic rock'n'roll." The Rough Guide to Rock later used the label "punk-blues" to describe the band. However, "punk" was not a characteristic associated with the band while it was active.

Sandman stated the band's aesthetic: "Keep it simple at all costs. Resist the temptation to add. If you're going to do something to a song, subtract."

== History ==
=== Career (1985–1991) ===
The band derived its name from the 1965 international smash hit by Roy Head and the Traits, "Treat Her Right." Their instrumentation was unusual, with Sandman's "low guitar" mimicking a bass guitar and Conway eschewing a full drum kit. Conway later observed, "When we started that band, one of the parameters was that everyone had to be able to carry their equipment into the gig in one trip. We wanted to keep things small and simple."

From the beginning, the band espoused a "back to basics" approach. Champagne said the idea was to start with the same building materials as the Rolling Stones or Led Zeppelin, but to come up with something of their own. A key factor was leaving much space in the music, which came about by circumstances as well as design. Soon after forming, the band got a gig at The Plough and Stars, a small bar in Cambridge whose owner wouldn't let them bring in drums, so Conway played a railing and stamped a trap door to the kitchen. Not long afterward, he acquired the cocktail drum. They intentionally wanted not to have a big kick-snare drum, which at the time was pervasive in rock music production.

The group's self-financed and self-titled debut was released on a small Boston record label in 1986 before being issued in the UK by Demon Records. The group signed to RCA Records, which reissued the debut in the United States. Their first recording attempt was a modest success – Champagne's "I Got a Gun" and Sandman's cover of James Blood Ulmer's "Where Did All the Girls Come From?" received some play on college radio. "I Think She Likes Me" describes Sandman's experience in a Fairplay, Colorado bar where a woman came on to him. Critic John Dougan described the debut as "slick, intelligent, sly, and well worth your while."

Tied to the Tracks was issued in 1989. Sales did not meet RCA's expectations. In the notes for their third record, the group wrote, "RCA decided that if our little basement tape could do so well, why not spend fifty times more money and it will be fifty times better! (They think everything works like that.)" Treat Her Right were dropped from their RCA contract.

What's Good for You, their third album, was issued on Rounder Records in 1991. The ragged, live-in-the-studio sound was partly inspired by the model established by Chess Records, which had released many classic blues and early rock and roll records. Shortly after this third release, Treat Her Right disbanded.

=== Other projects and post-breakup ===
Fitting later played with The The, The Coots and Session Americana. Champagne remained musically active, playing with groups such as The Jazz Popes. Sandman formed Morphine in 1989, which Conway joined in 1993. Although more blues-based than Morphine, Treat Her Right sowed the seeds of Sandman's later sound with its unusual instrumentation (Sandman's guitar with Treat Her Right was a three string custom model, making it sound more like a bass guitar) and slightly dark focus, most evident on the Sandman-penned songs.

Sandman died of a heart attack while onstage with Morphine in Italy in 1999. In 2004, Sandbox: The Mark Sandman Box Set was released. The 2-CD/1-DVD compilation was culled from Sandman's personal archive. It included several Treat Her Right songs, although for some unknown reason, Jim Fitting's name did not appear in the credits.

=== Reformation (2009–2011) ===
The Treat Her Right song "Rhythm & Booze" was featured on The Hangover soundtrack, released in 2009. That same year, The Lost Album, a record of unreleased Treat Her Right material, was released by Hi-n-Dry. Shortly thereafter, Treat Her Right reunited to mark the ten-year anniversary of Sandman's death at the Mark Sandman Memorial Concert in September, and the band continued activity. Champagne and Fitting led the new version of Treat Her Right, joined by Steve Mayone playing low guitar and Billy Beard (previously of the Boston new wave band Face to Face) playing drums. This incarnation of the band played some gigs in the Boston area, of which the latest appears to have been in 2011. Fitting then devoted his efforts to Session Americana, which had become more active again.

=== Billy, Jimmy, & Dave (2019–20) ===
In 2019, Conway, Fitting, and Champagne recorded an album. A live date was announced for January 19, 2020 at Club Passim in Cambridge—their first appearance together on stage since all were members of Treat Her Right. Conway was unable to participate due to health issues, with Larry Dersch and Jerome Deupree filling in on drums. Fitting told the audience Conway had recently restarted cancer treatment.

== Discography ==
- Treat Her Right (1986)
- Tied to the Tracks (1989)
- What's Good for You (1991)
- The Anthology 1985-1990 (1998)
- The Lost Album (2009)
