= Buffalo Tom =

American alternative rock band

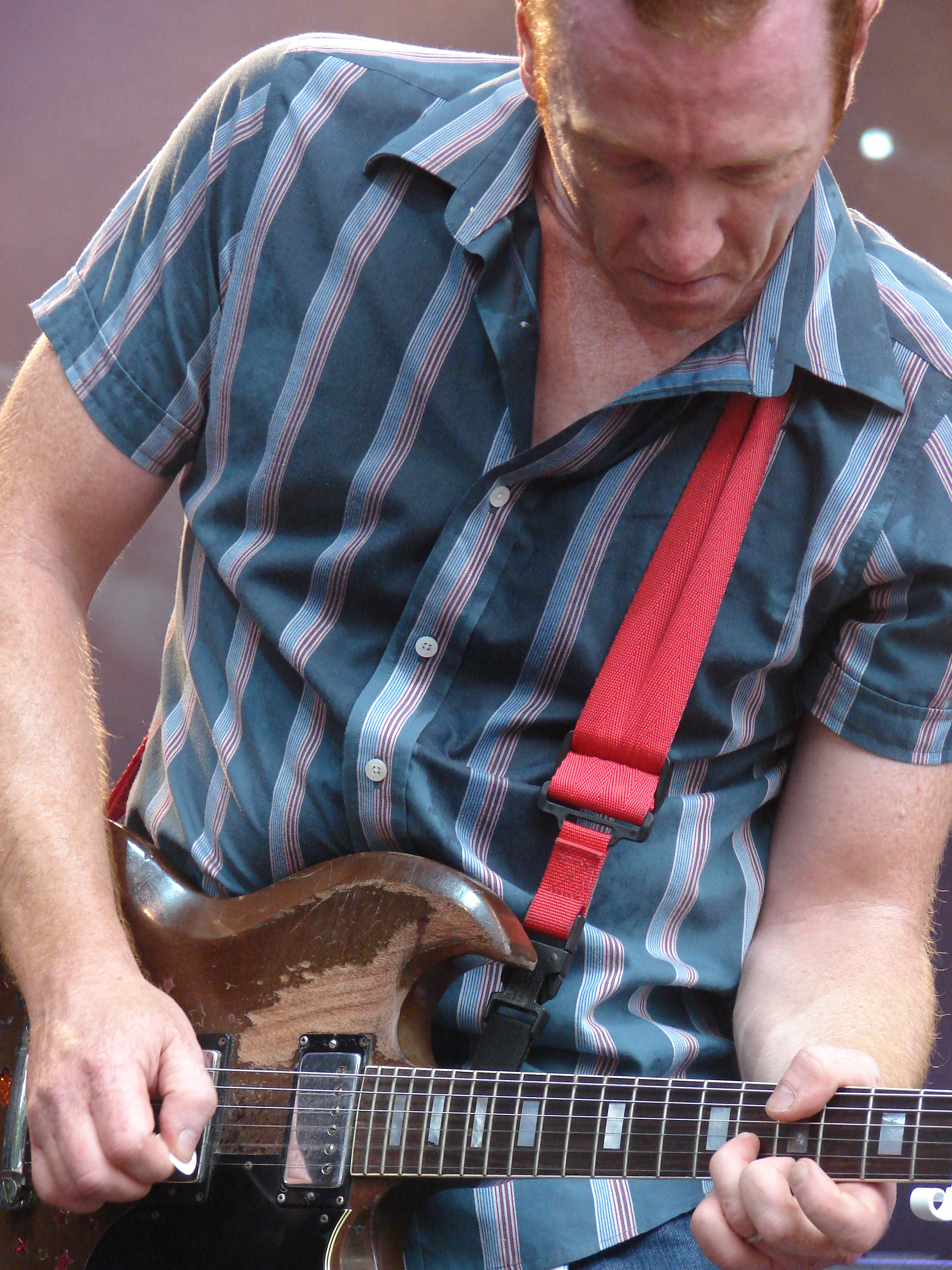
- Bill Janovitz

Background information
- Origin: Boston, Massachusetts, United States
- Genres: Alternative rock
- Years active: 1986–present
- Labels: SST, RCA, Situation Two, Megadisc, Ra, Beggars Banquet, East West, Polydor, Ammal/New West, Scrawny Music
- Members: Bill Janovitz; Chris Colbourn; Tom Maginnis
- Website: Official website

Buffalo Tom is an American alternative rock band from Boston, Massachusetts, formed in 1986. Its principal members are guitarist Bill Janovitz who also sings the majority of lead vocals, bassist and singer Chris Colbourn, and drummer Tom Maginnis. The band's name is derived from the band Buffalo Springfield and the first name of the drummer.

In 2025, Jeff Mezydlo of Yardbarker included the band in his list of "20 underrated bands from the 1990s who are worth rediscovering".

== Career ==
Buffalo Tom began with a friendship at the University of Massachusetts at Amherst among students Chris Colbourn, Tom Maginnis, and Bill Janovitz. Another friendship with guitarist/frontman J Mascis of Dinosaur Jr. helped the band's career to take off through Mascis assisting with the production on the band's first two albums. Mascis also played lead guitar on the song "Impossible" from Buffalo Tom's self-titled debut. Dinosaur Jr would also influence Buffalo Tom's music, as would Hüsker Dü, the Replacements, Moving Targets, and the Neats.

Buffalo Tom had their highest-charting songs in the mid-1990s: "Sodajerk" (1993) peaked at No. 8 and "Summer" (1995) peaked at No. 4 on the Heatseekers chart. Their album, Big Red Letter Day, peaked at no. 17 in the UK Albums Chart in October 1993.

The band contributed the track "For All To See" to the 1993 AIDS-Benefit Album No Alternative produced by the Red Hot Organization, and the track "Lolly Lolly Lolly, Get Your Adverbs Here" to the CD School House Rock! Rocks. Buffalo Tom's song "Sodajerk" was featured on the soundtrack to the 1994 television series My So-Called Life. They appeared in a club scene on My So-Called Life, episode 12, titled "Self-Esteem," playing "Late at Night." The episode originally aired on 17 November 1994.

The group also wrote the theme song to the short-lived 1999 sitcom The Mike O'Malley Show. In 1999, the song "Taillights Fade" was used in the Breckin Meyer/Elizabeth Berkley independent film Taillights Fade. They also recorded The Jam's "Going Underground" for the 2000 tribute album Fire and Skill: The Songs of the Jam. Issued as a double A-sided single, with Liam Gallagher and Steve Cradock's cover version of "Carnation", the single reached No. 6 in the UK Singles Chart in October 1999.

They were the final musical guest on The Jon Stewart Show. Buffalo Tom is a perennial performer at the Hot Stove Cool Music concerts that benefit Theo Epstein's Charity, 'Foundation to Be Named Later'.

After a lengthy hiatus through most of the decade, during 2007 Buffalo Tom re-emerged to perform at the South by Southwest Music Festival and to go on a summer tour across the US. An album, Three Easy Pieces, was released on July 10, 2007, through the New West label. The band has played a number of concerts in the US, Australia and Europe.

On November 24, 2010, it was announced through the band's Facebook and Twitter pages that their new album would be titled Skins, and was intended for release in mid-February 2011. It came out to positive reviews from AllMusic and others on March 8, 2011, through their own label Scrawny Records, via The Orchard distribution company. Quiet and Peace was released on March 2, 2018.

The band performed the theme song for NBC's Extended Family, called "We Thought We Were Done".

== Discography ==
=== Albums ===
- Buffalo Tom (1989)
- Birdbrain (1990)
- Let Me Come Over (1992)
- Big Red Letter Day (1993)
- Sleepy Eyed (1995)
- Smitten (1998)
- Instant Live 6/10/05 Paradise, Boston, MA (2005)
- Three Easy Pieces (2007)
- Skins (2011)
- Quiet and Peace (2018)
- Jump Rope (2024)

=== Compilation albums ===
- Asides from Buffalo Tom (2000)
- Besides: A Collection of B-Sides and Rarities (2002)

=== Singles and EPs ===
- "Sunflower Suit" (1989)
- "Enemy" (1989)
- "Crawl" (1990)
- "Birdbrain" (1990)
- "Fortune Teller" (1991)
- "Velvet Roof" (1992)
- "Taillights Fade" (1992) - No. 51 in NL
- "Mineral" (1992)
- "Sodajerk" (1993) - reached No. 7 on Billboard Alternative Songs
- "Treehouse" (1993)
- "I'm Allowed" (1994) - No. 37 in NL
- "Would Not Be Denied" (1994)
- "Summer" (1995)
- "Tangerine" (1995)
- "Wiser" (1998)
- "Knot In It/ Rachael" (1999)
- "Going Underground" (1999) - reached No. 6 in the UK as a double A-side with Liam Gallagher and Steve Cradock's version of "Carnation"
- "Bad Phone Call" (2007)
- "Guilty Girls" (2011)
- "Helmet" (2024)
- "New Girl Singing" (2024)
- "Autumn Leaves" (2024)
