= Bill Janovitz =

American musician and writer (born 1966)

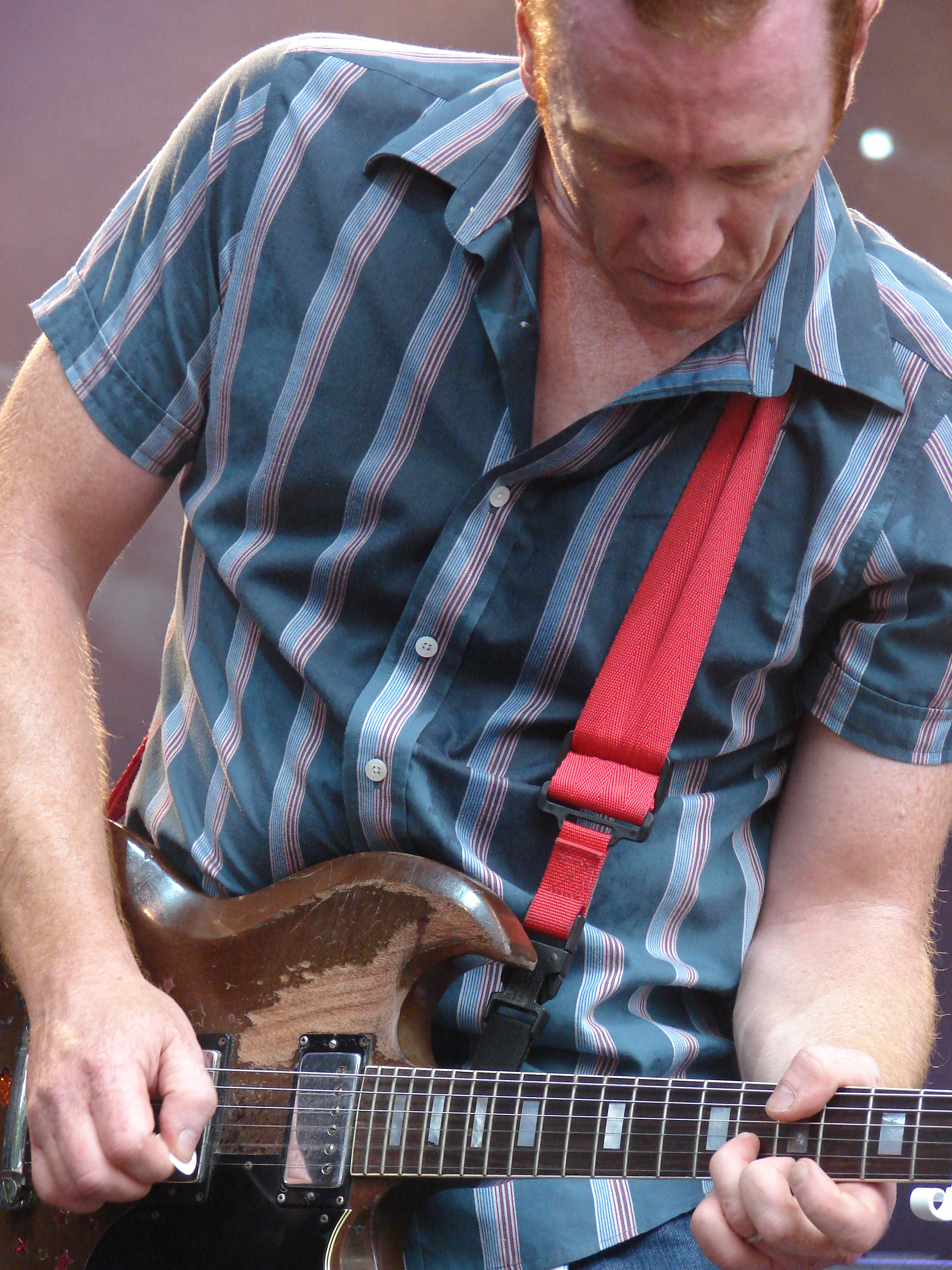

Background information
- Born: June 3, 1966 (age 60)
- Origin: Huntington, New York
- Genres: Alternative rock
- Occupations: Musician; writer
- Years active: 1987–present
- Website: BillJanovitz.com

Bill Janovitz (born June 3, 1966) is an American musician and writer. He is the singer, guitarist, and songwriter of alternative rock band Buffalo Tom, and has also released three solo albums. Janovitz has written extensively for Allmusic, authored the Exile on Main St. book for the 33 1/3 series, and contributed to Boston magazine, the Boston Phoenix, and Post Road magazine. He wrote Rocks Off: 50 Tracks That Tell the Story of the Rolling Stones (2013), Leon Russell: The Master of Space and Time's Journey Through Rock & Roll History (2023), which was a New York Times Best Seller, and The Cars: Let the Stories Be Told (2025).

== Professional career ==
After enrolling at the University of Massachusetts Amherst, Janovitz formed Buffalo Tom with fellow students Chris Colbourn and Tom Maginnis. A friendship with J. Mascis of Dinosaur Jr. helped the band's career to take off, with Mascis producing the band's first two albums to critical acclaim. Commercial success followed with their subsequent records as the band developed a fanbase both at home and abroad.

In 1997, Janovitz released the solo album Lonesome Billy, with help from Joey Burns and John Convertino of Giant Sand and Calexico, utilizing unused Buffalo Tom songs to form the bulk of the album.

During Buffalo Tom's long hiatus after Smitten in 1998, Bill worked with keyboardist Phil Aiken and Chris Toppin and released the album Up Here in 2001.

He continued to work with Aiken and released the album Fireworks on TV! as Crown Victoria (also including Tom Polce on drums and Josh Lattanzi on bass) in 2004.

Bill took many of the songs he wrote with his bar-band/side project The Bathing Beauties (featuring Tanya Donelly of Belly, Dean Fisher, Phil Aiken, Chris Toppin and Paul Kolderie) and put out a CD under the name Show People with Toppin.

Beginning in November 2008, Bill, as part of his Part Time Man of Rock blog, started a Cover of the Week project, featuring new recording of cover songs along with lengthy essays detailing his relationship with each of the songs. Some of these articles detail Bill's career in music, but many connect deeply to his personal life.

In 2011 Janovitz, along with Graham Parker and Kate Pierson, sang on the album Lost Songs Of Lennon & McCartney - From A Window, featuring covers of Lennon–McCartney songs that were originally recorded by artists other than the Beatles.

Janovitz's book Rocks Off: 50 Tracks That Tell the Story of the Rolling Stones was released in July 2013.

Janovitz's book Leon Russell: The Master of Space and Time's Journey Through Rock & Roll History was released in March 2023 and was a New York Times Best Seller.

His book The Cars: Let the Stories Be Told was released in September 2025.

== Personal life and family ==
Bill has three younger brothers, all in bands: the late Paul, who founded the band Cold Water Flat, Scott of the band The Russians and many others, and the youngest, Tom, of Sodafrog.

Since the end of Buffalo Tom's major-label career in the late 90s, he has developed a parallel career as a real-estate agent, based in Lexington, Massachusetts, with a particular interest in the city's mid-century modernist homes.

== Solo discography ==
- Lonesome Billy (1997)
- Up Here (2001)
- Fireworks on TV! (as Crown Victoria, 2004)
- Walt Whitman Mall (2013)
