= Paul Q. Kolderie =

American record producer

- Genre: Alternative rock
- Occupations: Recording engineer, record producer
- Years active: 1978–present

Paul Q. Kolderie is an American record producer, engineer, and mixer. He has worked with Pixies, Radiohead, Orangutang, Hole, Dinosaur Jr., Juliana Hatfield, Wax, Warren Zevon, Uncle Tupelo, Throwing Muses, Morphine, the Mighty Mighty Bosstones, Abandoned Pools, the Go-Go's, and Mike Gordon of Phish. He usually works with production partner Sean Slade.

Kolderie and Slade were friends from Yale University, where they played in bands together. They also became members of Sex Execs, a Boston-based new wave music band of the early 1980s.

The duo had their formative experience as producers while they were in Sex Execs. Most of the group lived in a house in Dorchester, Boston that was wired up as a primitive studio. Other bands came over to record as well, including a local act called Three Colors, which featured saxophonist Dana Colley, later of Morphine. As Sex Execs became more successful, they started recording in professional studios such as Syncro Sound, which was owned by the Cars. Kolderie learned from the engineers there. He recorded an EP for Three Colors at Syncro, earning his first production credit.

In 1985, Kolderie and Slade helped create Boston's Fort Apache Studios with Jim Fitting, another friend from Yale and Sex Execs, as well as musician-producer Joe Harvard. Kolderie has also played in the Detroit-based cowpunk band, Goober & the Peas, and contributed to Raisins in the Sun.

== Albums ==
=== Produced ===
- Big Dipper – Heavens, 1987
- Bullet LaVolta – The Gift, 1989
- Das Damen – Mousetrap, 1989
- Hullabaloo – Beat Until Stiff, 1989
- Blood Oranges – Corn River, 1990
- The Mighty Mighty Bosstones – Devil's Night Out, 1990
- The Lemonheads – Favorite Spanish Dishes, 1990
- The Lemonheads – Lovey, 1990
- Uncle Tupelo – No Depression, 1990
- Clockhammer – Carrot, 1991
- Firehose – Flyin' the Flannel, 1991
- Clockhammer – Klinefelter, 1991
- Field Trip – Ripe, 1991
- Uncle Tupelo – Still Feel Gone, 1991
- Titanics – Titanics (Taang!), 1991
- Morphine – Good, 1992
- Buffalo Tom – Let Me Come Over, 1992
- The Mighty Mighty Bosstones – More Noise and Other Disturbances, 1992
- The Mighty Mighty Bosstones – Where'd You Go?, 1992
- Blackfish – Blackfish, 1993
- The Welcome Mat – Gram, 1993
- Morphine – Cure for Pain, 1993
- Gigolo Aunts – Full-On Bloom, 1993
- Radiohead – Pablo Honey, 1993
- Belly – Are You Experienced, 1994
- Firehose – Big Bottom Pow Wow, 1994
- Miles Dethmuffen – Clutter, 1994
- Orangutang – Dead Sailor Acid Blues, 1994
- Gigolo Aunts – Flippin' Out, 1994
- Tripmaster Monkey – Goodbye Race, 1994
- Tackle Box – Grand Hotel, 1994
- Hole – Live Through This, 1994
- Belly – Moon, 1994
- The Mighty Mighty Bosstones – Question the Answers, 1994
- Wax – 13 Unlucky Numbers, 1995
- Echobelly – Great Things, Pt.1, 1995
- Echobelly – Great Things, Pt.2, 1995
- Morphine – Honey White, 1995
- The Upper Crust – Let Them Eat Rock, 1995
- The Mighty Mighty Bosstones – Let's Face It, 1997
- Warren Zevon – Life'll Kill Ya, 2000
- Piebald – We Are the Only Friends We Have, 2002
- Jason Bennett & the Resistance – Hope Dies Last, 2008
- Portugal. The Man- The Satanic Satanist, 2009
- Big D & The Kids Table- Fluent in Stroll, 2009
- Grant Langston & The Supermodels – Working Until I Die, 2012
- Sirsy – Coming into Frame, 2013
- Mike Gordon – Overstep, 2014

=== Mixed ===
- Radiohead – The Bends (album), 1995
- Papas Fritas – Papas Fritas, 1995
- Lush – Lovelife, 1996
- 12 Rods – Split Personalities, 1998
- Jess Klein – Draw Them Near, 2000
- The Sounds – Dying to Say This to You, 2006
- Joe Jackson – Rain, 2008
- Portugal. The Man – Censored Colors, 2008
- Buffalo Tom – Skins, 2011
- Peter Baldrachi – Tomorrow Never Knows, 2011
- Grant Langston & The Supermodels – Working Until I Die, 2012
- The Peasants – Big Sunny Day, 2015
- Spirit Family Reunion – "Hands Together", 2015
- Amy Fairchild – [Amy Fairchild] 2014
- Lilly Hiatt- Forever, 2025

=== Engineered ===
- Pixies – Come On Pilgrim, 1987
- Big Dipper – Heavens, 1987
- Carol Montag – White, 1987
- Dinosaur Jr. – Bug, 1988
- Throwing Muses – House Tornado, 1988
- Pixies – Surfer Rosa/Come On Pilgrim, 1988
- Pixies – Surfer Rosa, 1988
- Blake Babies – Earwig, 1989
- Bullet LaVolta – The Gift, 1989
- Plan 9 – Ham and Sam Jammin', 1989
- Das Damen – Mousetrap, 1989
- Volcano Suns – Thing of Beauty, 1989
- Christmas – Ultra Prophets of Thee Psykick Revolution, 1989
- Blood Oranges – Corn River, 1990
- The Mighty Mighty Bosstones – Devil's Night Out, 1990
- The Cavedogs – Joyrides for Shut-Ins, 1990
- Barrence Whitfield & the Savages – Let's Lose It, 1990
- Hullabaloo – Dead Serious, 1990
- Uncle Tupelo – No Depression, 1990
- Billy Bragg – Accident Waiting to Happen, 1991
- Throwing Muses – Counting Backwards, 1991
- Firehose – Flyin' the Flannel, 1991
- Clockhammer – Klinefelter, 1991
- Field Trip – Ripe, 1991
- Uncle Tupelo – Still Feel Gone, 1991
- Titanics – Titanics (Taang!), 1991
- Treat Her Right – What's Good For You, 1991
- Goober & the Peas – Complete Works of Goober & the Peas, 1992
- Throwing Muses – Firepile#1, 1992
- Throwing Muses – Firepile#2, 1992
- Morphine – Good, 1992
- The Mighty Mighty Bosstones – More Noise and Other Disturbances, 1992
- Blackfish – Blackfish, 1993
- Radiohead – Pablo Honey, 1993
- Miles Dethmuffen – Clutter, 1994
- Orangutang – Dead Sailor Acid Blues, 1994
- Radiohead – Itch, 1994
- Tripmaster Monkey – Goodbye Race, 1994
- Hole – Live Through This, 1994
- The Mighty Mighty Bosstones – Question the Answers, 1994
- Kristin Hersh – Strings, 1994
- Echobelly – Great Things, Pt.1, 1995
- Echobelly – Great Things, Pt.2, 1995
- Dink – Blame it on Tito, 1996
- Tracy Bonham – The Burdens of Being Upright, 1996
- Blameless – Signs Are All There, 1996
- 60 Ft. Dolls – Supernatural Joy EP, 1996
- Morphine – B-Sides and Otherwise, 1997
- Pixies – Death to the Pixies 1987-1991, 1997
- Jamie Blake – Jamie Blake, 1997
- The Mighty Mighty Bosstones – Let's Face It, 1997
- Hole – My Body, the Hand Grenade, 1997
- Treat Her Right – Anthology: 1985 - 1990, 1998
- Come – Gently, Down the Stream, 1998
- Gerard Collier – Gerard Collier, 1998
- The Mighty Mighty Bosstones – Live From the Middle East, 1998
- Fuzzy – Hurray for Everything, 1999
- Warren Zevon – Life'll Kill Ya, 2000
- The Mighty Mighty Bosstones – Pay Attention, 2000
- Echobelly – Best of Echobelly: I Can't Imagine World Without Me, 2001
- Pixies – Complete B-Sides, 2001
- Phil Aiken – Don't Look Down, 2001
- Dinosaur Jr. – Ear-Bleeding Country: The Best of Dinosaur Jr., 2001
- Kris Delmhorst – Five Stories, 2001
- The Go-Go's – God Bless The Go-Go's, 2001
- Uncle Tupelo – 89/93: An Anthology, 2002
- Matthew – Everybody Down, 2002
- Flying Nuns – Everything's Impossible These Days, 2002
- State Radio – Flag of the Shiners, 2002
- Warren Zevon – Genius: The Best of Warren Zevon, 2002
- Juliana Hatfield – Gold Stars 1992-2002: The Juliana Hatfield Collection, 2002
- Cave In – Lost in the Air, 2002
- Pixies – Pixies, 2002
- Cave In – Anchor (UK CD#2), 2003
- Everton Blender – King Man, 2003
- Kris Delmhorst – Songs for a Hurricane, 2003
- Piebald – All Ears, All Eyes, All the Time, 2004
- Avoid One Thing – Chopstick Bridge, 2004
- The Steepwater Band – Dharmakaya, 2004
- Catie Curtis – Dreaming in Romance Languages, 2004
- The Briggs – Leaving the Ways, 2004
- Jake Brennan & the Confidence Men – Love & Bombs, 2004
- The Figgs – Palais, 2004
- Read Yellow – Radios Burn Faster, 2004
- The Soft Explosions – Ride Between the Eyes Sandbox, 2004
- Toots & the Maytals – True Love, 2004
- Pixies – Wave of Mutilation: The Best of Pixies, 2004
- The Mighty Mighty Bosstones – The 20th Century Masters - The Millennium collection, 2005
- Kirsty MacColl – Best of Kirsty MacColls, 2005
- Lost City Angels – Broken World, 2005
- Kirsty MacColl – From Croydon to Cuba: An Anthology, 2005
- Juliana Hatfield – Made in China, 2005
- Sarah Borges – Silver City, 2005
- The Upper Crust – Cream of the Crust, 2006
- Sebadoh – III (US Expanded), 2006
- Jennifer Kimball – Oh Hear Us, 2006
- The Blizzard of 78 – Where All Life Hangs, 2006
- The Dresden Dolls – Yes, Virginia..., 2006
- Bill Morrissey – Come Running, 2007
- Heavy Trash – Going Way Out with Heavy Trash, 2007
- Toots & the Maytals – Light Your Light, 2007
- Warren Zevon – Preludes, 2007
- Radiohead – Radiohead Box Set, 2007
- Girl Authority – Road Trip, 2007
- Kelly Willis – Translated from Love, 2007
- Radiohead – Radiohead: The Best Of, 2008
- The Dresden Dolls – No, Virginia..., 2008
- Eric Hutchinson – Sounds Like This, 2008
- Big Dipper – Supercluster: The Big Dipper Anthology, 2008
- New Collisions – The Optimist, 2010
- Weed Kibbles – "Sally and Dentist's ICQ Crushes", 2012

== Songs produced ==
- Goo Goo Dolls – "Lazy Eye", 1997
