= Lovey (album) =

1990 studio album by the Lemonheads

Studio album by The Lemonheads
- Released: July 1990
- Genre: Alternative rock; pop punk; jangle pop; folk rock
- Label: Atlantic
- Producer: Paul Q. Kolderie

The Lemonheads chronology
Favourite Spanish Dishes (1990)	Lovey (1990)	It's a Shame About Ray (1992)

Professional ratings
Review scores
Source	Rating
AllMusic	3.5/5 stars
The Encyclopedia of Popular Music	2/5 stars
MusicHound Rock: The Essential Album Guide	2.5/5 stars
Pitchfork	7.4/10
The Rolling Stone Album Guide	3.5/5 stars
Select	3/5
Spin Alternative Record Guide	3/10

Lovey is the fourth studio album by the alternative rock band The Lemonheads. It was released in 1990 on Atlantic Records, the group's first for the record company.

== Production ==
The lineup for the recording was Evan Dando (lead vocals, guitar), Corey Loog Brennan (guitar), Jesse Peretz (bass guitar), and David Ryan (drums). The album was the last with founding member Peretz, who would leave the band to pursue a career in photography and filmmaking; founding member Ben Deily had left following their previous album, Lick, leaving Dando as the sole founding member for all future releases.

== Critical reception ==
Trouser Press called the album "a fine, varied collection," writing that it reveals "a punk kid almost all grown up, with no qualms about expressing his perhaps unfashionable faves/influences." The Tampa Bay Times called it "a mediocre combination of everything that is supposed to be cool about college radio." The Rolling Stone Album Guide wrote that "the rockers ... are augmented by occasionally introspective ballads, the best of which are disarmingly tuneful, and surprisingly moving." The Spin Alternative Record Guide wrote that the album "sank the band in Dinosaur-style power-mope."

== Track listing ==
All songs by Evan Dando unless otherwise stated.

1. "Ballarat" – 3:14
2. "Half the Time" – 2:45
3. "Year of the Cat" – 2:28
4. "Ride With Me" – 3:38
5. "Li'l Seed" (Corey Loog Brennan, Kenny Chambers, Dando, Clay Tarver) – 3:22
6. "Stove" – 3:08
7. "Come Downstairs" – 2:54
8. "Left for Dead" – 2:04
9. "Brass Buttons" (Gram Parsons) – 3:11
10. "(The) Door" (Brennan, Dando) – 5:40
11. "Untitled" – 1:21

Note: "Left for Dead" is a remake of "Clang Bang Clang," from Creator (1988); the lyrics are unchanged from the earlier version of the song.

== Charts ==
Chart (1990–1993)	Peak position
Australian Albums (ARIA)	118
