= Ernst Badian =

Austrian classical scholar (1925–2011)

Ernst Badian

Ernst Badian (8 August 1925 – 1 February 2011) was an Austrian-born classical scholar who served as a professor at Harvard University from 1971 to 1998.

== Early life and education ==
Badian was born in Vienna, Austria in 1925 and in 1938 fled the Nazis with his family to New Zealand. There he attended the University of Canterbury, Christchurch (then Canterbury University College), where he met his future wife Nathlie Ann Wimsett. He received a BA in 1945 and an MA the following year.

After a year teaching at the Victoria University of Wellington, Badian went to University College, Oxford, where he studied under George Cawkwell, gained a first class BA in Litt Hum in 1950, an MA in 1954 and a DPhil in 1956. In addition, he gained the degree of LittD from New Zealand's Victoria University of Wellington in 1962.

== Academic career ==
After teaching in the universities of Sheffield, Durham, and Leeds in England and at the University at Buffalo, he was appointed to Harvard's Department of History in 1971 and was cross-appointed to the Department of the Classics in 1973. He became John Moors Cabot Professor of History Emeritus in 1998.

An active promoter of classical studies in the United States, Badian helped found The American Journal of Ancient History (1976), the Association of Ancient Historians (1974), and the New England Ancient History Colloquium.

== Academic works ==
One of Badian's major areas of interest was Alexander the Great. Even though he never published a monography on him, he wrote several dozen articles or reviews related to Alexander and his time. His main goal was to counter the influential works of William Woodthorpe Tarn, who drew a very idealistic portrait of Alexander, presented as a fine gentleman spreading Greek civilisation over the Earth, while also dismissing some aspects of his personality (his drunkenness, bisexuality, or cruelty). Badian's depiction of Alexander was more that of a ruthless dictator. In 1958, Badian published his first article on Alexander, in which he bluntly wrote in the introduction:

Ever since 1933, Tarn's figure of Alexander the Dreamer has explicitly claimed the credit for this re-orientation: the phantom has haunted the pages of scholarship, and even source-books and general histories of philosophy and of ideas – at least in this country – have begun to succumb to the spell. Perhaps a quarter of a century is long enough for the life-span of a phantom: it is clearly threatening to pass into our tradition as a thing of flesh and blood. It is the aim of this article – an aim in which it can hardly hope to be immediately successful – to lay the ghost.

Eugene Borza writes that this paper—and another published the same year on Alexander's eunuch and lover Bagoas—created "a revolution in Alexander studies", as he exposed many flaws in Tarn's treatment of the Macedonian king. Many of his subsequent articles continued to contradict and harshly criticise Tarn's findings. For example, in his 1971's article on Agis III, Badian wrote that Tarn was "blinded by even more than his usual prejudice towards opponents of Alexander, and distort[ed] the actual facts in an all but irresponsible fashion".

== Honours ==
Badian was elected a fellow of the American Academy of Arts and Sciences in 1974.

In 1999 Austria awarded him the Cross of Honor for Science and Art (Österreichische Ehrenkreuz für Wissenschaft und Kunst). The same year, the University of Canterbury awarded him an honorary degree.

== Personal life and death ==
Badian died at the age of 85 after a fall in his home in Quincy, Massachusetts. He was survived by his widow Nathlie, his children Hugh and Rosemary, and several grandchildren and great-grandchildren.

== Legacy ==
The Ernst Badian Collection of Roman Republican Coins is housed at the Special Collections and University Archives of the Rutgers University libraries.

At the 2012 meeting of the Association of Ancient Historians in Chapel Hill, North Carolina, ancient historians T. Corey Brennan and Jerzy Linderski delivered papers reflecting on the historical methodologies employed by Badian.

== Works ==
- Foreign Clientelae 264–70 B.C. (Clarendon Press, Oxford, 1958), based on his 1956 dissertation
- "Alexander the Great and the unity of mankind", Historia: Zeitschrift für Alte Geschichte, Bd. 7, H. 4 (Oct., 1958), pp. 425–444.
- Studies in Greek and Roman History (Blackwell, Oxford, 1964)
- "The Early Historians", in Thomas Allen Dorey (editor), Latin Historians (Basic Books, New York, 1966) pp. 1–38.
- "Agis III", Hermes, Vol. 95 (1967), pp. 170–192.
- Roman Imperialism in the Late Republic, 2nd ed. (1st commercial ed.) (Blackwell, Oxford/Cornell University Press, 1968)
- Publicans and Sinners (Blackwell, Oxford/Cornell University Press, 1972, reprinted, with corrections and critical bibliography, Cornell University Press, 1983)
- From Plataea to Potidaea (Johns Hopkins University Press, 1993)
- Zöllner und Sünder (Wissenschaftliche Buchgesellschaft, Darmstadt, 1997)
- Collected papers on Alexander the Great, Oxford, Routledge, 2012. ISBN 978-0-415-37828-4

Editor for:

- Ancient Society and Institutions. Studies Presented to Victor Ehrenberg (Blackwell, Oxford, 1966)
- Polybius. Selected passages in translation (Washington Square Press, NY, 1966)
- Sir Ronald Syme, Roman Papers (vols. 1 & 2) (Oxford University Press, 1979)
- Translated Documents of Greek and Rome, vols. 1, 2, 3, edited jointly with Robert K. Sherk (Johns Hopkins University Press, then Cambridge University Press)
