= Solid Ground =

Solid Ground may refer to:

- Solid Ground (Seattle), a social service organization in Washington, U.S.

== Music ==
- Solid Ground (John Anderson album), 1993
- Solid Ground (Peter Baldrachi album), 2006
- Solid Ground (The Black Seeds album), 2008
- Solid Ground (Rob Crosby album), 1990
- Solid Ground (Gugun Blues Shelter album), 2011
- Solid Ground (Ronnie Laws album), 1981
- Solid Ground, an album by Smokie, 1981
- Solid Ground, an album by Wolf Mail, 2002
- "Solid Ground", a song by Marit Larsen from Under the Surface
