= Lose It All =

Lose It All may refer to:

== Songs ==
- "Lose It All", a single by Therapy? from One Cure Fits All
- "Lose It All", a song by A Perfect Murder from Cease to Suffer
- "Lose It All", a song by the Backstreet Boys from Never Gone
- "Lose It All", a song by Beres Hammond from Never Ending
- "Lose It All", a song by Brett Eldredge from Illinois
- "Lose It All", a song by BulletProof Messenger from Arm Yourself
- "Lose It All", a song by Peter Baldrachi from Back to the Start
- "Lose It All", a song by Peter Baldrachi from Tomorrow Never Knows
- "Lose It All", a song by Pillar from Confessions
- "Lose It All", a song by Rush of Fools from Wonder of the World
- "Lose It All", a song by Sasami from Blood on the Silver Screen
- "Lose It All", a song by SiR from the deluxe version of Heavy
- "Lose It All", a single by Atmozfears
- "Lose It All", a single by Sam Tompkins
- "Lose It All", a song by Brennan Heart featuring Jake Reese
- "Lose It All", a song by Excellence (pop group) from The Region of Excellence

== Other ==
- "Lose It All" (The L Word), an episode of the television series The L Word: Generation Q
- "Lose It All", a potential outcome in "The Lion's Share" on The Price Is Right

== See also ==
- "Runnin' (Lose It All)", a song by Naughty Boy featuring Beyoncé and Arrow Benjamin
- "Lost It All", a bonus track by Avenged Sevenfold from Nightmare
