= Tomorrow Never Knows (disambiguation) =

"Tomorrow Never Knows" is the final track of the Beatles' 1966 studio album Revolver.

Tomorrow Never Knows may also refer to:

- Tomorrow Never Knows (Peter Baldrachi album), 2011
- Tomorrow Never Knows (Beatles album), 2012
- "Tomorrow Never Knows" (Mr. Children song), 1994
- "Tomorrow Never Knows", a song by Bruce Springsteen from Working on a Dream, 2009
- "Tomorrow Never Knows", a song by Ulver from the 2000 album Perdition City
