= Turn It On (disambiguation) =

Turn It On is a 2003 album by Ronan Keating.

Turn It On may also refer to:

- Turn It On!, a 1971 album by Sonny Stitt
- Turn It On (Russell Morris album), 1976
- "Turn It On" (song), a 1981 song by Level 42
- Turn It On (Gugun and the Bluesbug album), 2007
- Turn It On, a 2010 album by Kevin Costner & Modern West
- Turn It On (EP), a 2015 EP from Eli Young Band
- "Turn It On", a song by Ladytron from their 2002 album Light & Magic
- "Turn It On", a song by Sleater-Kinney from their 1997 album Dig Me Out
- "Turn it On", a song by Franz Ferdinand from their 2009 album Tonight: Franz Ferdinand
- "Turn It On!", a song by Morgenshtern
