= Where'd You Go =

Where'd You Go may refer to:

- Where'd You Go? (The Mighty Mighty Bosstones EP), 1991
  - The title track from Where'd You Go?
- "Where'd You Go" (Fort Minor song), 2006
- "Where'd You Go" a song by Destiny's Child from The Writing's on the Wall, 1999
