= Back to the Start =

Back to the Start may refer to:

- "Back to the Start" (song), a 2010 track on Lily Allen's album It's Not Me, It's You
- Greatest Hits: Back to the Start, Megadeth's second greatest hits album
- Back to the Start (album), an album by Peter Baldrachi
