= Lick (album) =

Studio album by The Lemonheads
- Released: April 1989 (original LP); 1992 (CD reissue with bonus tracks)
- Recorded: 1988
- Genres: Pop-punk; folk-pop
- Label: Taang!
- Producers: Tom Hamilton, Terry Katzman

The Lemonheads chronology
Creator (1988)	Lick (1989)	Favourite Spanish Dishes (1990)

Singles from Lick
- 1. "Luka" Released: 1989

Lick is the third album by The Lemonheads and the last to feature founding member Ben Deily. It was released in 1989 and was the group's last album before signing to major label Atlantic. A typo on the album itself erroneously states its release date as 1988. As with their first two albums, it was re-released as a CD in 1992, with two bonus tracks.

== Album information ==
As would become something of a trademark, the Lemonheads' lineup featured some significant differences on Lick from both previous and later albums. Although the band had officially broken up after recording their second album, Creator, in 1988, they were offered a chance to play a European tour, so in early '89 the band reformed with Evan Dando on drums, Corey Loog Brennan and Ben Deily on guitars, and Jesse Peretz on bass. Deily and Dando, the Lemonheads' two singers, were still not getting along, and their personality clashes and technical difficulties in the studio meant that only five new original songs were recorded. To fill out Lick, several earlier unreleased tracks, B-sides, and covers were added to the album.

After completion, Deily left the band permanently, replaced on their subsequent European tour by Dando and Brennan on guitars and Mark Natola on drums. Peretz, one of the original Lemonheads along with Dando and Deily, stayed on to record their next album, Lovey, but left after the supporting tour in '91. Ever since, Dando has been the Lemonheads' sole permanent member amid frequent lineup changes.

== Critical reception ==
Professional ratings
Review scores
Source	Rating
AllMusic	4/5 stars
NME	8/10
Spin Alternative Record Guide	6/10

- Q (2/96, p. 109) – "...the seeds of their future and mainstream successes were firmly sown...and about to emerge..."
- Melody Maker (12/16/95, p. 32) – Recommended – "...the rapidly budding Dando [flexes] a burgeoning [songwriting] talent....the real killer here is "Luka", a wired rewrite of Suzanne Vega's ghastly, mawkish hit; [shows a] talent for melancholy recontextualisation of the oddest source material..."

== Track listing ==
All songs by Evan Dando unless otherwise stated.

1. "Mallo Cup" – 2:12
2. "Glad I Don't Know" – 1:21
3. "7 Powers"* (Ben Deily) – 2:32
4. "A Circle of One" – 2:49
5. "Cazzo di Ferro" (Corey Loog Brennan, Dando) – 3:45
6. "Anyway" (Deily) – 3:10
7. "Luka" (Suzanne Vega cover) – 3:09
8. "Come Back D.A." – 1:54
9. "I Am a Rabbit" (Proud Scum cover) – 1:46
10. "Sad Girl" – 1:48
11. "Ever" (Deily) – 2:48
12. "Strange" (Mel Tillis, Fred Burch) (Patsy Cline cover) – 2:57
13. "Mad" – 1:41

Note: Only tracks 1, 3, 4, 6, and 8 were written and recorded specifically for Lick. Tracks 2 and 9 are new recordings of songs from the Lemonheads' 1986 EP, Laughing All the Way to the Cleaners, while 10 and 11 were recorded for Hate Your Friends and 7 was originally intended for Creator. Tracks 12 and 13, the "Luka" single's B-sides, are bonus tracks added for the album's 1992 CD reissue ("Mad" also happens to be the first song the Lemonheads ever recorded, an outtake from Laughing All the Way).

== Personnel ==
The Lemonheads

- Evan Dando – drums, lead vocals, guitar on tracks 3, 6, 7, 10
- Ben Deily – guitar, piano, lead vocals on tracks 3, 6, 11
- Corey Loog Brennan – lead guitar
- Jesse Peretz – bass guitar
- John Strohm – drums on track 7
- Doug Trachten – drums on track 10
