= The Gift (Bullet LaVolta album) =

Studio album by Bullet LaVolta
- Released: 1989
- Genre: Punk, heavy metal
- Label: Taang!/RCA
- Producer: Paul Q. Kolderie, Bullet LaVolta, Tom Hamilton

Bullet LaVolta chronology
Bullet LaVolta (1988)	The Gift (1989)	Gimme Danger (1990)

The Gift is the debut album by the American band Bullet LaVolta, released in 1989. Taang! Records licensed it to RCA Records, which took over the band's contract. Bullet LaVolta supported the album with a North American tour that included shows opening for Soundgarden. The band's road manager was the actor Donal Logue, who wrote about the experience for National Lampoon.

== Production ==
The album was produced primarily by Paul Q. Kolderie. Bullet LaVolta wanted as big a sound as possible, something they felt that not enough "underground" rock bands strove for. Ken Chambers, of Moving Targets, joined the band on guitar prior to the recording sessions; drummer Chris "Cougar" Guttmacher left the band at the conclusion of them. The album was recorded on a 24-track, with few overdubs and the vocals often mixed below the instruments.

== Critical reception ==
Professional ratings
Review scores
Source	Rating
AllMusic	4/5 stars
Alternative Rock	5/10
The Philadelphia Inquirer	2.5/4 stars
Record-Journal	A−
The Tampa Tribune	3.5/4 stars

The Boston Globe said that "Bullet LaVolta positions itself in the gray, but not dull, area between the Cult and Guns n' Roses, cut with inspiration out of the best of the 1977-'78 English punkers." The Washington Post said that the album "is punchier than most metal—for one thing, the album sports 13 songs, several of them less than three minutes long—but most of Gift still sounds like Dokken or Judas Priest, only faster." The Bay City Times referred to it as "that 'perfect' mix between metal and punk".

Newsday opined that, "like the best punk belters, Bullet LaVolta singer Yukki Gipe sounds like the delinquent stepchild of punk forefather Iggy Pop." The Record-Journal stated that "Guttmacher knows that speed and finesse are correctly placed in the order of importance"; the paper later listed The Gift as the seventh best rock album of 1989. The Tallahassee Democrat labeled The Gift "punk with '80s machinery."

AllMusic concluded that "these Massachusetts punkers demonstrate an almost Sex Pistols-like swagger that so many hardcore screamers never stop shouting long enough to notice." Trouser Press deemed the album "a swell, chandelier-shattering collection of powerfully noisy rock songs punctuated by blasts from the lethal twin guitars of Clay Tarver and Ken Chambers."

== Track listing ==
No.	Title	Length
1.	"X Fire"
2.	"Little Tiny Pieces"
3.	"Over the Shoulder"
4.	"Mother Messiah"
5.	"Chalkdust"
6.	"Blind to You"
7.	"Off Kilter"
8.	"Underground Well"
9.	"The Gift"
10.	"One Room Down"
11.	"Birth of Death"
12.	"Dead Wrong"
13.	"Trapdoor"
