= Orangutan (disambiguation) =

The orangutan is a species of great ape.

Orangutan may also refer to:

- Orangutang (band), a rock band from Boston
- Orangutan Opening or Sokolsky Opening, a chess opening
- Orangutan (film), a 2026 documentary film
