= Kandas =

Kandas may refer to:

- Kandas language, Papua New Guinea
- Synonym of "oralman", Kazakh repatriants
- Plural of Kanda (lineage), Kongo
- Plural for "kanda", or "chapter" in Sanskrit sources
- "Kandas", a track from album Satu Untuk Berbagi
