= Ajah =

Ajah may refer to:

- Ajah (Genesis), a minor biblical figure
- Ajah (Wheel of Time), a subdivision of Aes Sedai society in the Wheel of Time series
- Ajah, Lagos, Nigeria
- American Journal of Ancient History

== See also ==
- Aja (disambiguation)
- Ajahn, a Thai-language term meaning teacher
