= Ska-Core, the Devil, and More =

EP by the Mighty Mighty Bosstones
- Released: March 8, 1993
- Recorded: December 2, 1992 (live tracks)
- Genre: Ska-core
- Length: 18:16 (without hidden track)
- Label: Mercury
- Producer: The Mighty Mighty Bosstones

The Mighty Mighty Bosstones chronology
| More Noise and Other Disturbances (1992) | Ska-Core, the Devil, and More (1993) | Don't Know How to Party (1993) |

Professional ratings
Review scores
| Source | Rating |
|---|---|
| Allmusic | 3/5 stars |

Ska-Core, the Devil, and More is an EP by the Mighty Mighty Bosstones. It was first released in 1993 by Mercury Records.

== Track listing ==
1. "Someday I Suppose" (Dicky Barrett, Nate Albert, Joe Gittleman) – 3:26
2. "Think Again" (Minor Threat) – 1:56
3. "Lights Out" (Angry Samoans) – 0:49
4. "Police Beat" (SSD) – 2:09
5. "Simmer Down" (Bob Marley) – 3:34
6. "Drugs and Kittens"/"I'll Drink to That" (Live) (Barrett, Gittleman) – 6:17
7. "Howwhywuz Howwhyam" (Live) (Barrett, Gittleman) – 2:26 [Bonus Track]

== Personnel ==
- Dicky Barrett – lead vocals
- Nate Albert – guitar, backing vocals
- Joe Gittleman – bass, backing vocals
- Joe Sirois – drums
- Tim Burton – saxophone
- Kevin Lenear – saxophone
- Dennis Brockenborough – trombone
- Ben Carr – Bosstone, backing vocals
- Fred Bortolotti – assistant engineer
- Phil Greene – engineer
- Ross Humphrey – engineer
- Cindy Bortman – photography
- Bob Paré – front cover photo
