= Back to Higher Ground =

Studio album by The Briggs
- Released: September 12, 2006
- Recorded: May 17 – June 20, 2006
- Genre: Punk rock
- Length: 36:36
- Label: SideOneDummy
- Producer: Joe Gittleman

The Briggs chronology
| Leaving the Ways (2004) | Back to Higher Ground (2006) | Come All You Madmen (2008) |

Professional ratings
Review scores
| Source | Rating |
|---|---|
| Allmusic | 4/5 stars |

Back to Higher Ground is the third album by The Briggs, released on September 12, 2006.

== Track listing ==
All songs written by Joey LaRocca and Jason LaRocca.

1. "Back to Higher Ground" – 2:46
2. "Let Them Know" – 3:06
3. "Song of Babylon" – 2:24
4. "Common & Unknown" – 3:13
5. "Maritime Tragedies" – 3:27
6. "Everyone's an Actor" – 3:29
7. "Wasting Time" – 2:27
8. "Insane" – 3:36
9. "My Own Enemy" – 2:33
10. "Harder to Stand" – 3:07
11. "Blacklist" – 3:14
12. "Don't Care" – 2:54
