= 13 Unlucky Numbers =

1995 studio album by Wax

Studio album by Wax
- Released: February 28, 1995
- Recorded: Summer 1993, Fort Apache, Boston, MA, United States
- Genres: Pop punk, punk rock, alternative rock
- Length: 23:45
- Labels: Cargo; Interscope
- Producers: Paul Q. Kolderie, Sean Slade

Wax chronology
What Else Can We Do? (1992)	13 Unlucky Numbers (1995)	Hangin' On (2009)

Singles from 13 Unlucky Numbers
- 1. "Who Is Next" Released: 1995; 2. "California" Released: 1995

Professional ratings
Review scores
Source	Rating
AllMusic	4.5/5 stars
Daily Breeze	3/4 stars
The Tampa Tribune	3.5/4 stars

13 Unlucky Numbers is the second and final album by Wax, and their major label debut. The album spawned the singles "California" and "Who is Next", both with music videos directed by Spike Jonze, who is also credited for the album's photography. "California" peaked at No. 28 on Billboard's Modern Rock Tracks chart; the video depicted a running man engulfed in flames.

The LP version released on independent label Shattered Records includes "Hangin' On" as a bonus track, as well as being pressed on colored vinyl.

== Production ==
The recording sessions took place during the summer of 1993 at Fort Apache Studios. The album was produced by Paul Q. Kolderie and Sean Slade. Although it lists 13 tracks, it only includes 10 songs, as the last three tracks are silent.

== Critical reception ==
The Washington Post wrote: "Tuneful and direct, such songs as 'Stop Sign' and 'Just a Visitor' expand the Ramones' legacy without simply aping the much-aped blitzkrieg bop." The New York Times deemed "California" "one of the weakest" tracks on the album, writing that "the band is not as good as its video."

The San Diego Union-Tribune called the album "hook-laden, poppy-punk." The Daily Breeze thought that "Wax rips through ravers such as 'Who Is Next' with a combination of breakneck speed and discipline that reminds one of British punk-rockers the Buzzcocks in its prime." The Columbus Dispatch included the album on its list of the best rock 'n' roll albums of 1995.

== Track listing ==
All tracks are written by Wax, except where noted.

13 Unlucky Numbers track listing
No.	Title	Length
1.	"Who Is Next"	2:12
2.	"In Spite of Me"	2:08
3.	"Torn in Two"	3:30
4.	"Stop Sign"	2:05
5.	"California"	2:15
6.	"Just a Visitor"	2:17
7.	"Jiffy Boy"	1:48
8.	"Settle Down"	3:05
9.	"Too Well"	2:04
10.	"Knot" (Loomis Fall)	1:54
11.	"Thirteen"	0:06
12.	"Unlucky"	0:06
13.	"Numbers"	0:06
