= Come All You Madmen =

Studio album by The Briggs
- Released: June 17, 2008
- Genre: Punk rock
- Label: SideOneDummy
- Producer: Joe Gittleman

The Briggs chronology
| Back to Higher Ground (2006) | Come All You Madmen (2008) |

Professional ratings
Review scores
| Source | Rating |
|---|---|
| AbsolutePunk.net | (68%) link |
| Allmusic | link |

Come All You Madmen is the fourth album from Los Angeles–based punk rock band The Briggs. The album was released June 17, 2008, through SideOneDummy Records and was produced by The Mighty Mighty Bosstones' Joe Gittleman, as with their previous album Back to Higher Ground.

== Track listing ==
1. "Madmen" – 2:31
2. "This Is L.A." – 3:40
3. "Bloody Minds" – 4:06
4. "What Was I Thinking?" – 2:46
5. "Charge Into The Sun" – 3:14
6. "Not Alone" – 3:43
7. "Ship of Fools" – 2:58
8. "This Ship Is Now Sinking" – 3:31
9. "Oblivion" – 4:03
10. "Until Someone Gets Hurt" – 3:02
11. "Final Words" – 3:38
12. "Molly" – 4:30

== Personnel ==
=== Band members ===
- Jason LaRocca – guitar, vocals
- Joey LaRocca – vocals, guitar
- Ryan Roberts – bass guitar
- Chris X – drums

=== Additional musicians ===
- Ken Casey – vocals on "Mad Men"
- Dicky Barrett – vocals on "Charge Into The Sun"
- Brian Baker – guitar on "Charge Into The Sun" and "Bloody Minds"
- Tim Burton, Kevin Lenear, and Chris Rhodes – horns on "Bloody Minds"
- Jeremy Conrad – percussion, orchestral snare
- Joe Gittleman – production
