= True Love (Toots & the Maytals album) =

Studio album by Toots & the Maytals
- Released: April 6, 2004
- Genre: Reggae
- Length: 61:27
- Label: V2
- Producer: Richard Feldman

Toots & the Maytals chronology
| World Is Turning (2003) | True Love (2004) | Light Your Light (2007) |

True Love is an album by Toots & the Maytals. It is a collection of their classics re-recorded with guest artists including Willie Nelson, Eric Clapton, Jeff Beck, Trey Anastasio, No Doubt, Ben Harper, Bonnie Raitt, Manu Chao, The Roots, Ryan Adams, Keith Richards, and The Skatalites. The album was produced and conceived by Richard Feldman and released on the V2 label.

True Love won the award for Best Reggae Album at the 47th Annual Grammy Awards.

== Critical reception ==
Professional ratings
Review scores
| Source | Rating |
|---|---|
| AllMusic | link |
| Blender | link |
| Robert Christgau | A |
| Rolling Stone | link |

Revisiting the album after Toots Hibbert's death in 2020, Robert Christgau appraised the opening songs as "glorious" and said that overall, "with Hibbert's slightly less muscular timbre as roughly soulful as ever", these remakes "constitute as fine an album as he ever made".

== Track listing ==
All tracks credited to Toots Hibbert, unless otherwise noted.

| # | Name | Featured guest(s) | Time |
|---|---|---|---|
| 1 | "Still Is Still Moving to Me" | Willie Nelson | 3:11 |
| 2 | "True Love Is Hard to Find" | Bonnie Raitt | 4:27 |
| 3 | "Pressure Drop" | Eric Clapton | 2:57 |
| 4 | "Time Tough" | Ryan Adams | 3:23 |
| 5 | "Bam Bam" | Shaggy and Rahzel | 3:46 |
| 6 | "54-46 Was My Number" | Jeff Beck | 4:40 |
| 7 | "Monkey Man" | No Doubt | 3:39 |
| 8 | "Sweet and Dandy" | Trey Anastasio | 3:17 |
| 9 | "Funky Kingston" | Bootsy Collins and The Roots | 4:06 |
| 10 | "Reggae Got Soul" | Ken Boothe and Marcia Griffiths | 2:58 |
| 11 | "Never Grow Old" | Terry Hall, The Skatalites and U-Roy | 3:27 |
| 12 | "Take a Trip" | Bunny Wailer | 3:57 |
| 13 | "Love Gonna Walk Out on Me" | Ben Harper | 3:33 |
| 14 | "Careless Ethiopians" | Keith Richards | 3:20 |
| 15 | "Blame on Me" | Rachael Yamagata | 3:57 |
| 16 | "Merry Blues" | Manu Chao | 3:49 |
| 17 | "Reggae Got Soul" | Gentleman | 2:54 |

== Personnel ==
- Toots and the Maytals:
  - Andrew Bassford
  - Radcliffe Bryan
  - Paul Douglas
  - Charles Farquharson
  - Carl Harvey
  - Frederick "Toots" Hibbert
  - Clifton Jackie Jackson
  - Norris Webb
  - Stephen Stewart
  - Leba Thomas

Production

- Engineers/mixers: Richard Feldman, Rudolph Valentino, Tom Weir, Ted Paduck Executive Senior Producer Mike Cacia,
- Producer: Richard Feldman

== Awards ==
| Year | Nominated work | Category | Award | Result | Notes | Ref. |
|---|---|---|---|---|---|---|
| 2005 | True Love | Best Reggae Album | Grammy | Won | | |
