= The Konks =

American rock and roll band

- Origin: Boston, USA
- Genres: Rock, garage rock, psychobilly, punk rock
- Years active: 1998-2011
- Labels: Bomp! Static Eye
- Past members: Bob Wilson (guitar); Jon Porth (bass); Kurt Davis (vocals, drums)

The Konks was an American rock and roll band, based in Boston, Massachusetts. They released their self-titled debut album in March 2005, with Bomp! Records. The band was later signed to Static Eye Records and released their second album Nerves in early 2010. The band played their final show at Great Scott in Allston, Massachusetts in early 2011, but would reunite for a reunion show in 2016 for bands who played at the Abbey Lounge prior to its closing.

== Studio albums ==
- The Konks (2005)
- Nerves (2010)

== In other media ==
- The Konks' song "29 Fingers", from their debut album, is featured in the video game Rock Band, and drummer and vocalist Kurt (an employee of Rock Band developer Harmonix Music Systems) is featured in the drums tutorial for the game.

== Band members ==
- Kurt Davis (vocals/drums) - Kurt was formerly the lead singer for Bullet LaVolta and a drummer for Kustomized.
- Bob Wilson (guitar)
- Jon Porth (bass)
