= Slow Recovery =

Studio album by Peter Baldrachi
- Released: May 15, 2020
- Studio: Rear Window, Brookline, MA
- Genre: Rock, Roots Rock, Power Pop
- Length: 35:00
- Label: Prodigal Son
- Producer: Peter Baldrachi, Gary Rand

Peter Baldrachi chronology
Back To The Start (2012)	Slow Recovery (2020)	Nothing’s Promised (2025)

Slow Recovery is the fourth release from Peter Baldrachi. After a long break between albums, Baldrachi released four singles beginning in 2015 and an EP in 2019. Slow Recovery was recorded by Craig Welsch, mixed by Benny Grotto, and mastered by Joe Lambert. The album features performances from Duke Levine (Bonnie Raitt, Mary Chapin Carpenter, Peter Wolf), Dave Mattacks (Fairport Convention, Paul McCartney, Brad Hallen (Susan Tedeschi, Aimee Mann, Roomful of Blues), and Milt Reder (Four Piece Suit, Barrence Whitfield) among many other Boston musicians. The album has received positive reviews with The Big Takeover calling it “his most affecting work to date” and Power Pop Station describing it as “brilliant and beautiful.” The title track was released as a single in January 2020.

== Track listing ==
All tracks are written by All Lyrics/Music: Peter Baldrachi/Gary Rand except Track 4 Lyrics: Baldrachi; Music: Baldrachi/Rand; Track 5 Lyrics: Baldrachi/Rand; Music: Baldrachi; Track 6 Lyrics/Music: Baldrachi All tracks published by Crash Boom Bam Music (ASCAP) and Gleason Rand Music (ASCAP) except Track 6 by Crash Boom Bam Music (ASCAP).

No.	Title	Length
1.	"Slow Recovery"	3:36
2.	"People Don't Change"	4:40
3.	"Seasons"	3:13
4.	"In My Heart"	3:39
5.	"Side By Side"	4:04
6.	"The Sweeping Hand of Love"	5:00
7.	"Killing Time"	4:03
8.	"Bitter Pill"	2:49
9.	"Never Go Away"	4:15

== Personnel ==
- Peter Baldrachi – Lead Vocals, Drums, Percussion
- Gary Rand – - Electric & Acoustic Guitar, Lead Guitar, Electric Bass
- Ingrid Gerdes – - Backing Vocals on all tracks
- Milt Reder – Electric & Acoustic Guitar, Lead Guitar
- Duke Levine – Lead Guitar, Slide Guitar, Resonator, Mandolin
- Dana Flood – Pedal Steel Guitar
- Peter Linnane – Piano, Hammond B3, Farfisa, Mellotron, Pump Organ
- Dave Mattacks – Drums on In My Heart & Killing Time
- Brad Hallen – Double Bass on Seasons & Bitter Pill; Electric Bass on Side By Side
- Dean Cassell – Electric Bass on The Sweeping Hand of Love
- John Aruda – Saxophone on Slow Recovery
- Scott Aruda – Trumpet on Slow Recovery
- Corbin Smith – Trumpet on Never Go Away
- Jay Stanley – Congas, Percussion
- Benny Grotto – Percussion on Slow Recovery
- Paul Wolstencroft – Wurlitzer electric piano on Side By Side

== Production notes ==
- Produced by Peter Baldrachi and Gary Rand
- Recorded by Craig Welsch at Rear Window, Brookline, MA
- Additional recording by K.R. Mogenson and Corbin Smith at Kissy Pig, Allston, MA and by Andrew Clifford at Main Street Music, Brewer, ME
- Mixed by Benny Grotto at Mad Oak, Allston, MA
- Mastered by Joe Lambert at Joe Lambert Mastering, Jersey City, NJ
- Edited by Corbin Smith
- Layout and Design by Steven Jurgensmeyer
