= Far East Blues Experience =

Compilation album by Gugun Power Trio

Compilation album by Gugun Power Trio a.k.a. Gugun Blues Shelter
- Released: January 2011
- Genre: Blues rock
- Length: 57:29
- Label: Grooveyard

Gugun Power Trio a.k.a. Gugun Blues Shelter chronology
Gugun Blues Shelter (2010)	Far East Blues Experience (2011)	Satu Untuk Berbagi (2011)

Professional ratings
Review scores
Source	Rating
Musik Review	(9/15)
Hooked on Music	Respectable
Rock Times	Mixed

Far East Blues Experience is a compilation album of Gugun Power Trio a.k.a. Gugun Blues Shelter. The album was released by Grooveyard Records in early month of January 2011. The album was the first release under Grooveyard Records, and the first release too for the band under name Gugun Power Trio.

== Track listing ==
All song written and composed by Gugun Power Trio a.k.a. Gugun Blues Shelter.

No.	Title	Length
1.	"Woman"	4:10
2.	"Turn It On"	4:39
3.	"Fallin' Down"	3:35
4.	"Who Is To Blame"	3:29
5.	"Spinnin' Around Me"	4:00
6.	"Holding On"	4:35
7.	"Move On"	4:10
8.	"Talk Too Much"	4:28
9.	"Plastic People"	5:04
10.	"Night Flying"	4:22
11.	"Emptiness"	3:28
12.	"Good Things, Bad Things"	5:26
13.	"White Dog Jam"	3:27
14.	"Whiskey Women (Acoustic)"	2:05

== Personnel ==
- Gugun - Lead Guitar and Lead Vocals
- Jono Armstrong - Bass guitar
- Bowie - Drums
- Ardi - bass # 1–6)
- Agung - drums # 1–6)
- Iskandar - drums # 7–9)
