= Peter Baldrachi =

American singer-songwriter, drummer, and guitarist

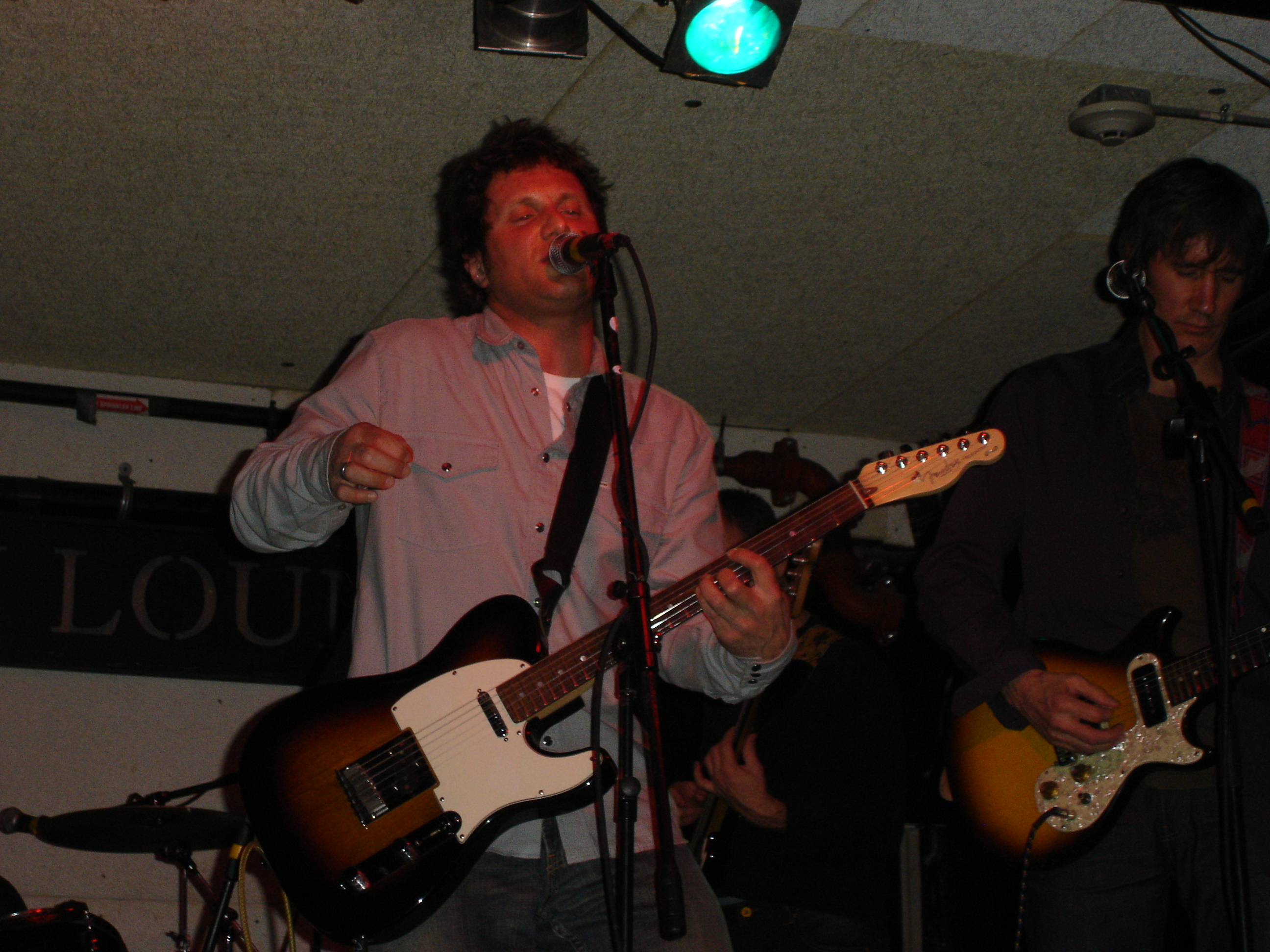
- (Live 2008)

Background information
- Born: Peter Baldrachi; February 12, 1967 (age 59)
- Origin: Boston, United States
- Genres: Indie rock, roots rock, power pop
- Instruments: Drums, vocals, guitar, percussion
- Label: Prodigal Son
- Website: www.peterbaldrachi.com

Peter Baldrachi (born February 12, 1967) is an American Boston-based singer-songwriter, drummer and guitarist. His style and sound has been compared to the likes of Paul Westerberg, Velvet Crush, Teenage Fanclub, and Big Star. His classic pop songwriting mixes in bits and pieces of Matthew Sweet, late-era Replacements, Goats Head Soup -era Rolling Stones, and on the more obscure side, The Beatifics and The Gladhands. He has released four well-received albums and several singles since 2006.

== Recording history ==
After releasing a record in 2003 with his former band Krushr, Baldrachi began writing and recording his first solo album. Solid Ground was recorded at Kissy Pig Studios (The Upper Crust, State Radio, The Real Kids, Sierra Leone's Refugee All Stars) and released on Prodigal Son Records in December 2006. The album's guitar-driven power pop highlights Baldrachi's classic pop songwriting style. Several Boston musicians including guitarist Gary Rand, vocalist Alice Austin (Zola Turn, Queen Tangerine), bassists Steve Buonomo and Dave Leitch, guitarist Richard Mirsky (The Mirskys, The Devotions) and keyboardists Lester Goodwine and David Horak played on the recordings. Solid Ground was mixed by Pete Peloquin (The Pixies, Oasis, Mission Of Burma). The album earned positive reviews from the likes of The Big Takeover, Amplifier Magazine, The Noise, Indie Pages, and The Boston Globe,. In 2008, the track "You're Gonna Miss Me Someday" appeared on Not Lame Recordings' "International Pop Overthrow, Vol. 11.

Baldrachi started writing new songs in 2008 and began recording his follow up to Solid Ground in 2009. Tomorrow Never Knows was released on September 27, 2011. The album appeared on several end-of-the-year lists including Power Pop Action's 100 Favorite Albums of the Year (#5), The Pure Pop Pub's Top 15 For 2011 (#8), Power Pop Station's Top 50 Albums (#12), Powerpopaholic's Top 25 Power Pop Albums of 2011 (#25), and Absolute Power Pop's Top 75 (#40).

Originally released as Tomorrow Never Knows in September 2011, Back to the Start was remixed by Ed Stasium, (Ramones, Mick Jagger, The Smithereens, Reverend Horton Heat, Nada Surf), and re-released adding another song "Picture On My Wall," recording additional parts, and resequencing the album's tracks. Released in May 2012, "Back To The Start" features performances by guitarist, bassist, and arranger Gary Rand, keyboardists Dave Lieb (The Vinyl Skyway) and Peter Linnane (The Farewells), backing vocalists Alice Austin (The Lavas, Stark Raving Mad) and Amy Fairchild, keyboardist and 2012 Rock & Roll Hall of Fame inductee Ian McLagan (Small Faces, Faces, The Rolling Stones, Billy Bragg), singer-songwriter Amy Rigby (solo, Wreckless Eric), multi-instrumentalist Ian Kennedy (Reverse, Dennis Brennan), and cellist Aristides Rivas. The record was recorded at Kissy Pig Studios by K.R. Mogenson (The Upper Crust, Vinyl Skyway), and mixed and mastered by Ed Stasium at The Kozy Tone Ranch. The first single, "In The Dead of Night," was released on May 15, 2012. A second single, "Someone Isn't Me,' was released on August 28, 2012.

After releasing five singles and a compilation EP from 2015 to 2019, Baldrachi released his latest album, Slow Recovery in May of 2020. The album features performances from Gary Rand, Duke Levine (Bonnie Raitt, Mary Chapin Carpenter, Peter Wolf), Dave Mattacks (Fairport Convention, Paul McCartney), Brad Hallen (Susan Tedeschi, Aimee Mann, Roomful of Blues), Ingrid Gerdes, Dana Flood, and Milt Reder (Four Piece Suit, Barrence Whitfield & The Savages) among many other Boston musicians. The album received positive reviews with The Big Takeover calling it "his most affecting work to date" and Power Pop Station describing it as "brilliant and beautiful." The title track was released as a single in January 2020.

Nothing's Promised was released in March 2025. The album was once again recorded by Craig Welsch at Rear Window Studios, mixed by Benny Grotto at Mad Oak Studios, and mastered by Joe Lambert at Joe Lambert Mastering. The album was well received with The Big Takeover saying “His old power-pop/guitar rock dexterity still comes a cropper on the LP’s bookends, the opening “Hard to Believe” and closing, 2024 single “Tomorrow,” plus the middle helping of the fuller-Replacements-esque (/Successful Failures-like) “Sometimes I Just Gotta Get Away,” while his songwriting skills remain stalwart. These days he does it all, with gusto." Additionally, Poprock Record states, "Baldrachi is back and as promising as ever," while Power Popaholic rates it "highly recommended, 8/10."The album features Peter Baldrachi on drums, vocals and percussion, Mike Hermans on guitar, and David Becker on bass. Other guests include Justin Lopes and Zack Brines on keyboards, percussionist Jay Stanley, Billy Cross (Bob Dylan, Robert Gordon, Link Wray) on guitar, Kevin Barry (Rosanne Cash, Jackson Browne, Peter Wolf) on lap steel, vocalists Ingrid Gerdes and Sonya Rae Taylor, and guitarist Van Gordon Martin (Dub Apocalypse, John Brown's Body). The first single, “Sometimes I Just Gotta Get Away,” was released on October 18, 2024. A second single, “Tomorrow,” was released on December 13, 2024.

== Discography ==
=== Albums ===
- Solid Ground (2006)
- Tomorrow Never Knows (2011)
- Back to the Start (2012)
- Slow Recovery (2020)
- Nothing's Promised (2025)

=== EPs ===
- Solid Ground EP (2007)
- Change EP (2019)

=== Singles ===
- Solid Ground (2007)
- In The Dead of Night (2012)
- Someone Isn't Me (2012)
- You’re Gonna Miss Me Someday (Ed Stasium Remix) (2015)
- Change (2018)
- Breathe (2019)
- Saturday (2019)
- The Suffering (2019)
- Slow Recovery (2020)
- Side By Side (2020)
- The Sweeping Hand of Love (2021)
- In The Shadow (Single Mix) (2023)
- Sometimes I Just Gotta Get Away (2024)
- Tomorrow (2024)

=== Compilations ===
- International Pop Overthrow, Vol. 11 (2008) Not Lame Recordings – "You're Gonna Miss Me Someday"
- International Pop Overthrow: Vol. 26 (2025) Omnivore Recordings – “Tomorrow”
