= Midnight Soul Serenade =

Studio album by Heavy Trash
- Released: October 27, 2009
- Genre: Neo-Rockabilly
- Label: Fat Possum

Heavy Trash chronology
| Going Way Out with Heavy Trash (2007) | Midnight Soul Serenade (2009) |

Professional ratings
Aggregate scores
| Source | Rating |
|---|---|
| Metacritic | 74/100 |
Review scores
| Source | Rating |
| AllMusic | 4/5 stars |
| Pitchfork | 7/10 |

Midnight Soul Serenade is an album by Heavy Trash, released in 2009. It contains a cover of "Bumble Bee", written by LaVern Baker.

== Track listing ==
All songs written and composed by Jon Spencer and Matt Verta-Ray except where noted.

| No. | Title | Writer(s) | Length |
|---|---|---|---|
| 1. | "Gee, I Really Love You" | | 3:17 |
| 2. | "Good Man" | | 2:57 |
| 3. | "Bumble Bee" | LaVern Baker, Leroy Fullylove | 1:58 |
| 4. | "The Pill" | | 5:25 |
| 5. | "Pimento" | | 1:35 |
| 6. | "(Sometimes You Got to Be) Gentle" | | 3:27 |
| 7. | "Isolation" | | 3:24 |
| 8. | "Bedevilment" | | 2:46 |
| 9. | "Sweet Little Bird" | Jon Spencer, Matt Verta-Ray, Charlie Spencer | 3:47 |
| 10. | "That's What Your Love Gets" | | 3:15 |
| 11. | "In My Heart" | | 4:32 |
