= Creator (album) =

Studio album by The Lemonheads
- Released: August 1988 (original LP); 1992 (extended CD reissue, with three live bonus tracks)
- Genre: Punk rock
- Label: Taang!
- Producer: Tom Hamilton

The Lemonheads chronology
Hate Your Friends (1987)	Creator (1988)	Lick (1989)

Professional ratings
Review scores
Source	Rating
AllMusic	3/5 stars
Spin Alternative Record Guide	6/10

Creator is the second album by American alternative rock band The Lemonheads. It was issued three different times: first as an LP in 1988, then as the second half of the CD Create Your Friends in 1989, and eventually as a standalone album on CD in 1992 with three bonus live tracks, recorded on radio station VPRO in The Netherlands. It is one of only three albums to feature the full original lineup of Evan Dando, Ben Deily, and Jesse Peretz.

== Background ==
When the band first formed, Deily and Dando would swap instruments, playing guitar and singing on tracks each wrote himself, and drums for songs the other wrote. The first "official" Lemonheads drummer, Doug Trachten, was brought in for their first album Hate Your Friends. On Creator, John Strohm of the band Blake Babies plays drums on all of the original tracks, while Mark Natola played drums for the two live bonus songs at the end of the CD reissue. Also, by the time the live tracks were recorded—during the European tour supporting the Lemonheads' final TAANG! album, Lick (1989)—Deily had left the band to complete his degree at Harvard College; lead guitar on those tracks (and the voice of "Evan Dando" during the interview segment) is provided by Corey Loog Brennan.

The cover is a photo of Ivan Kreilkamp, a school friend of Evan and Ben. Ivan is attributed with coming up with the band's name.

== Track listing ==
All songs written by Ben Deily, except where indicated.

Side One

1. "Burying Ground"
2. "Sunday"
3. "Clang Bang Clang" (Dando)
4. "Out" (Dando)
5. "Your Home Is Where You're Happy" (Charles Manson)
6. "Falling"

Side Two

1. "Die Right Now" (Dando)
2. "Two Weeks in Another Town"
3. "Plaster Caster" (Gene Simmons)
4. "Come to the Window"
5. "Take Her Down"
6. "Postcard"
7. "Live Without"

1992 CD bonus tracks

1. "Luka" (Suzanne Vega)
2. Interview
3. "Mallo Cup" (Dando)

== Personnel ==
The Lemonheads

- Evan Dando - guitar, vocals
- Ben Deily - guitar, vocals, keyboards
- Jesse Peretz - bass
- John Strohm - drums
- Corey Loog Brennan - lead guitar on 14 & 16
- Mark Natola - drums on 14 & 16

Note: Generally, Dando and Deily would sing lead vocals on songs each wrote. In addition, Dando sings lead on two cover songs on the album: the Kiss song "Plaster Caster" and "Your Home Is Where You're Happy," originally released on the 1970 Charles Manson album Lie: The Love & Terror Cult.
