= Heavy Trash (album) =

Studio album by Heavy Trash
- Released: April 19, 2005
- Genre: Neo-Rockabilly, cowpunk
- Label: Yep Roc
- Producer: Jon Spencer, Matt Verta-Ray

Heavy Trash chronology
Heavy Trash (2005)	Going Way Out with Heavy Trash (2007)

Professional ratings
Review scores
Source	Rating
AllMusic	4/5 stars
The Guardian	4/5 stars
Pitchfork	7.4/10

Heavy Trash is the debut album by Heavy Trash, released on Yep Roc in 2005.

== Track listing ==
All tracks are written by Jon Spencer and Matt Verta-Ray.

No.	Title	Length
1.	"Dark Hair'd Rider"	1:51
2.	"Lover Street"	2:55
3.	"The Loveless"	2:38
4.	"Walking Bum"	3:55
5.	"Justine Alright"	2:43
6.	"Under the Waves"	3:49
7.	"The Hump"	3:15
8.	"Mr. K.I.A."	3:36
9.	"Gatorade"	2:29
10.	"This Day Is Mine"	3:06
11.	"Fix These Blues"	2:58
12.	"Take My Hand"	3:28
13.	"Yeah Baby"	2:40
