= Numbers (The Briggs album) =

Studio album by The Briggs
- Released: 2003
- Genres: Skate punk; street punk
- Label: Disaster Records

The Briggs chronology
Is This What You Believe (2001)	Numbers (2003)	Leaving the Ways (2004)

Professional ratings
Review scores
Source	Rating
Allmusic	4/5 stars
Ox-Fanzine	7/10

Numbers is the second album from Los Angeles-based punk rock band The Briggs.

== Track listing ==
1. "3rd World War" 3:25
2. "Media Control" 3:06
3. "Bored Teenager" 3:26
4. "Face Off" 2:09
5. "Dead Men (Don't Tell Tales)" 2:35
6. "Red Alert" 2:56
7. "My Defense" 2:36
8. "13197" 3:10
9. "Voice Box" 2:37
10. "Keep Us Alive" 3:25
11. "Down" 2:25
12. "Head Shrink, Dead Shrink" 2:39
13. "These Streets" 2:38
14. "Heroes by Choice" 2:50

== Personnel ==
- Jason LaRocca – guitar, vocals
- Joey LaRocca – vocals, guitar
- Duck Matthews – bass guitar, backing vocals
- Chris X – drums
