= Gugun Blues Shelter =

- Gugun Blues Shelter's logo

Background information
- Also known as: Gugun Power Trio
- Origin: Jakarta, Indonesia
- Genres: Blues, funk, soul, rock, acoustic
- Years active: 2004–present
- Labels: Grooveyard Records (US), Demajors (Indonesia)
- Members: Gugun; Fajar; Bowie
- Past members: Isman; Arditya; Agung; Jono
- Website: www.instagram.com/gbluesshelter/

Gugun Blues Shelter (GBS), or Gugun Power Trio (for the American and European market), is an Indonesian blues band, formed in Jakarta, Indonesia, in 2004. The current members are Gugun on guitar, Fajar Adi Nugroho on bass and Bowie on drums. They have released nine albums.

== Career ==
The band formed in 2004 to play in blues bars in Jakarta. They have played in jazz clubs and festivals. They were influenced by Jimi Hendrix, Stevie Ray Vaughan, Betty Davis, and Led Zeppelin. Initially, the name of the band was The Blues Bug, which was later changed to Blue Hand Gang, later known as Gugun and The Blues Bug, and eventually Gugun Blues Shelter or Gugun Power Trio (for the American and European market). They changed the band's name because a Greek band had already used the name Blues Bug for ten years.

At the end of 2004, they released their first independent album, Get the Bug. The featured musicians on the album were Gugun, Jono and Iskandar.

In early 2007, they released their second album, Turn It On, on Sinjitos Records. The album was voted as one of the best Indonesian albums of 2007 by Rolling Stone Indonesia. It was also voted the number one blues album of the year, with Gugun voted as the best blues guitarist in Southeast Asia, in 2007 by MTV Trax Magazine.

Bowie joined the band in 2007 (or 2008), replacing Iskandar on drums.

In 2010, they independently released a self-titled album as a replacement for their Set My Soul on Fire album, which failed due to conflict with their labels.

In 2011, Gugun Blues Shelter were chosen by online votes from fans as winners of the Hard Rock Café's Global Battle of the Bands competition, celebrating Hard Rock Café's 40th anniversary.

They were scheduled to perform on Sunday, 26 June 2011 at Hyde Park, alongside Bon Jovi, Rod Stewart and The Killers.

== Discography ==
=== Studio albums ===
As Deni and Gugun (De Gun)

- De Gun Project (1999)

As Gugun and The Bluesbug

- Get the Bug (2004)
- Turn It On (2007)

As Gugun Blues Shelter

- Gugun Blues Shelter (2010)
- Satu Untuk Berbagi (2011)
- High Life (2015)
- Hitam Membiru (2016)

As Gugun Power Trio

- Far East Blues Experience (2011, compilation album)
- Solid Ground (2011)
- Soul Shaker (2013)

=== Original soundtracks ===
- Gugun and the Bluesbug's single "Mengejar Harapan" appeared on the soundtrack of the Indonesian movie Laskar Pelangi.
