= Get the Bug =

Get The Bug

Studio album by Gugun and the Bluesbug
- Released: 2004
- Genre: Blues rock
- Label: Self Released

Gugun and the Bluesbug chronology
Get The Bug (2004)	Turn It On (2007)

Get the Bug is the debut studio album by Indonesian blues rock band Gugun and the Bluesbug, which later changed to Gugun Blues Shelter and then the band also known as Gugun Power Trio.

== Track listing ==
1. Twenty Dollars
2. Move On
3. Take It Slow
4. Talk Too Much
5. On The Run
6. Plastic People
7. Orangantagram
8. Ask Your Soul
9. Night Flying
10. Trouble Town
11. Last Orders

== Personnel ==
- Gugun - Lead Guitar and Lead Vocals
- Jono Armstrong - Bass guitar
- Iskandar -Drums
