= Ripe (Field Trip album) =

1991 studio album by Field Trip

Studio album by Field Trip
- Released: April 1991
- Recorded: Cambridge, Massachusetts; Spring 1991
- Genre: Indie rock Power pop College rock
- Length: 38:59
- Label: Slash
- Producer: Paul Q. Kolderie; Sean Slade

Field Trip chronology
Headgear (1990)	Ripe (1991)

Ripe is the third and final studio album by Pleasanton, California-based rock band Field Trip. It was released in April 1991 by Slash Records. In addition to the band's own lineup, Ripe also features keyboard playing by Faith No More's Roddy Bottum.

== Critical reception ==
Professional ratings
Review scores
Source	Rating
AllMusic	3/5 stars
Chicago Tribune	2.5/4 stars
Christgau's Consumer Guide	(choice cut)
Deseret News	3/4 stars

The Chicago Tribune's David Rothschild gave Ripe 2 and a half stars out of 4, writing that the album "...combines elements of metal, country and new wave with a local bar band sound. [Lead singer and guitarist] Jim Galbraith's catchy, twanging guitar hooks and gawky vocals help define the band's playful personality, occasionally bringing to mind the Young Fresh Fellows." Brent Ainsworth of the Santa Cruz Sentinel wrote that the album "...brings back memories of the Knack, who shocked the charts with "My Sharona" in 1979. You remember how harmless and upbeat the Knack was, don't you? This is harmless and upbeat – in other words, initially fun but a little boring in the long run."

== Track listing ==
1. Let's Stay In
2. Nothing Better To Do
3. Ugly
4. Please
5. Come Along
6. Hard To Say
7. You Spin Me Round (Like A Record)
8. Sit On My Hands
9. Another Lonely Day
10. Wake Up Alone
11. Second Cousin
12. Ballad Of Field Trip

== Personnel ==
=== Field Trip ===
- Jim Galbraith - lead guitar
- T.S. Galbraith - drums
- Greg Kinkle - bass
- Steve Laborde - rhythm guitar

=== Guest musicians ===
- Roddy Bottum - keyboards
- Jim Fitting - harmonica

=== Technical personnel ===
- Tony Dawsey - engineering
- Paul Q. Kolderie - engineering, mixing, production
- Carl Plaster - engineering
- Sean Slade - engineering, mixing, production
