= Kleinfeld =

Kleinfeld is a surname of German origin. The name means "little field" or "small field".

== People surnamed Kleinfeld ==
- Andrew Kleinfeld (born 1945), American federal judge, husband to Judith
- Gerald R. Kleinfeld, founder of the German Studies Association
- Judith Kleinfeld (1944–2025), American professor of psychology and author, wife to Andrew
- Klaus Kleinfeld (born 1957), German businessman
- Philip M. Kleinfeld (1894–1971), New York politician and judge

== See also ==
- Klinefelter
