= More Noise and Other Disturbances =

1992 studio album by The Mighty Mighty Bosstones

Studio album by the Mighty Mighty Bosstones
- Released: 1992
- Genres: Ska, punk rock
- Length: 30:12
- Label: Taang!
- Producer: Paul Q. Kolderie

The Mighty Mighty Bosstones chronology
Where'd You Go? (1991)	More Noise and Other Disturbances (1992)	Ska-Core, the Devil, and More (1993)

More Noise and Other Disturbances is the second studio album by the American band the Mighty Mighty Bosstones. It was released in 1992 by Taang! Records. It was a hit on college radio. "Where'd You Go" was released as a single.

== Critical reception ==
Professional ratings
Review scores
Source	Rating
AllMusic	3/5 stars
Deseret News	3.5/4 stars

The Washington Post wrote that the horns "are the most stylistically consistent thing on the album, which hops across a variety of bouncy or slamming genres, from the hardcore of 'Guns and the Young' to the hip-hop of 'Bad in Plaid'." The Deseret News deemed More Noise and Other Disturbances "a bristling mix of punk rock, rock, funk and ska."

Tiny Mix Tapes called the album, along with Question the Answers, "the band’s best work," and wrote that they both "[hold] up surprisingly well."

== Track listing ==
1. "Awfully Quiet" (The Mighty Mighty Bosstones) – 3:08
2. "Where'd You Go" (Dicky Barrett, Nate Albert) – 3:26
3. "Dr. D" (Barrett, Joe Gittleman) – 2:01
4. "It Can't Hurt" (Barrett, Gittleman) – 2:28
5. "What's at Stake" – 2:53 (Originally by Slapshot)
6. "Cowboy Coffee" (Barrett, Gittleman) – 1:55
7. "I'll Drink to That" (Barrett, Gittleman) – 3:10
8. "Guns and the Young" (Barrett, Albert) – 2:22
9. "He's Back" (Barrett, Albert, Gittleman) – 3:12
10. "Bad in Plaid" (Barrett, Dennis Brockenborough) – 2:04
11. "They Came to Boston" (Barrett, Albert) – 3:30

Japan CD bonus track

12. "Sweet Emotion" – 2:52 (Originally by Aerosmith)
- Previously available on Where'd You Go? EP.

== Personnel ==
- Dicky Barrett – lead vocals
- Nate Albert – guitar, background vocals
- Joe Gittleman – bass, background vocals
- Tim "Johnny Vegas" Burton – saxophone
- Kevin Lenear – saxophone
- Dennis Brockenborough – trombone
- Joe Sirois – drums
- Josh Dalsimer – drums on tracks 2, 3, 6, 8 and 9
- Tyler Oulin – trumpet
- Paul Q. Kolderie – producer, engineer
- Steve Malone – assistant engineer
- Frank Gaide – photography
- Randy Hughes – photography
- Mim Michelove – photography
