= Gugun Blues Shelter (album) =

Gugun Blues Shelter a.k.a. Self Titled

Studio album by Gugun Blues Shelter a.k.a. Gugun Power Trio
- Released: March 2010
- Recorded: Tema Studio
- Genre: Blues rock
- Length: 40:40 Minutes
- Label: Off The Record

Gugun Blues Shelter a.k.a. Gugun Power Trio chronology
Turn It On (2007)	Gugun Blues Shelter a.k.a. Self Titled (2010)	Far East Blues Experience (2011)

Gugun Blues Shelter a.k.a. Self-Titled, is the third studio album by the Indonesian blues rock band Gugun Blues Shelter, which later, in 2011 they also known as Gugun Power Trio. The album was the first one under Gugun Blues Shelter name, which replaced the past name Gugun and the Bluesbug. In the band line-up, only Gugun, the lead guitar and lead vocal, that still remained as original member. The album was also the first one featuring the new drummer, Bowie, after his session role in the band.

== Track listing ==
All song written and composed by Gugun Blues Shelter, later in 2011 a.k.a. Gugun Power Trio.

No.	Title	Length
1.	"Fight For Freedom"	5:57
2.	"Emptyness"	5:26
3.	"Old Friend"	4:12
4.	"Good Thing Bad Things"	4:07
5.	"On The Run"	3:29
6.	"When I See You Again"	4:20
7.	"Whiskey Woman"	2:13
8.	"Your The Man"	4:01
9.	"White Dog"	6:51
Total length:		40:40

=== Lyrics Concept ===
In their official site, the band revealed the lyrics concept and inspiration in every each song that included in the album.

- “Fight for freedom” talks about the struggle for freedom by rising new nations and small oppressed countries.
- “Emptiness” is a bit of a mash up of randomness… Who said lyrics need to make sense anyway?
- “Old friend”We all meet people in the journey of life that we become really close to and then for whatever reason (usually money or women) we become enemies. The tables drastically turn and we look back on it with deep remorse.
- “On the Run” was written in 2004 on the day of the bombing of the Australian embassy in Kuningan, Jakarta. I (Jono) was on my way to work and running late by 10 mins. The embassy was opposite my office. I felt the blast from afar and witnessed the immediate aftermath… Pay’s to be late sometimes I guess.
- “Good things bad things” talks about life in general and the differences in character that all humans possess in their soul.
- “When I see you again” is written as a message to the other half of our soul who we are far away from and miss soooo much that words can no longer express.
- “Whiskey Woman” is about a guy who has had enough of his current life and partner that he decides to go out and get smashed… and look for a whiskey woman.
- “You’re the man” is dedicated to the minority of sweaty, watery-eyed leeches who feed themselves on tax-payers money and ‘compulsory gifts’ while thousands of their citizens starve… You know what I’m talking about.
- “White Dog” is dedicated to people that have wasted our time, energy and money during our time as a band.

== Personnel ==
- Gugun - Lead Guitar and Lead Vocals
- Jono Armstrong - Bass guitar
- Bowie - Drums
