= Bullet LaVolta =

American rock band

- Origin: Boston, Massachusetts, U.S.
- Genres: Alternative rock, alternative metal, punk rock, grunge, funk metal
- Years active: 1987–1992
- Labels: Taang!, RCA, Matador
- Past members: Clay Tarver; Bill Whelan; Corey "Loog" Brennan; Chris "Cruster" Guttmacher; Yukki Gipe; Todd Philips; Kenny Chambers; Duke Roth

Bullet LaVolta was an American alternative rock band from Boston, Massachusetts, formed in January 1987 by four college disc jockeys: Clay Tarver (guitar, now of Chavez), Bill Whelan (bass), Corey "Loog" Brennan (guitar) and Chris "Cruster" Guttmacher (drums). The band later added singer Yukki Gipe (Kurt Davis) after he responded to an advertisement. The band's style of music was a kind of punk, heavy metal, and hardcore punk hybrid, reminiscent of diverse bands such as Naked Raygun, Motörhead and early Fugazi.

== History ==
Bullet LaVolta performed their first show at a dive bar in Boston called Chet's Last Call to a crowd of about fifteen people, but soon became one of Boston's most popular live acts. They gained most of their notoriety by playing college shows in Boston (usually at either MIT or Harvard, with bigger acts like The Lemonheads, Dag Nasty, and the Rollins Band).

The band released their self-titled EP on Taang! Records with Moving Targets guitarist Kenny Chambers joining the line-up in 1988. In 1989, they recorded and released their first full-length album, The Gift, originally released on Taang!. The band's road manager around that time was actor Donal Logue. In 1990, they released the Gimme Danger EP (which includes a cover of "Detroit Rock City") on Metal Blade before signing to RCA Records, who purchased and re-released Bullet Lavolta and The Gift on a single disc. The record was reviewed in People magazine and given a good rating. The album sold modestly and the band became well-known enough that their contract was renewed by RCA. A year later, they recorded and released their follow-up, Swandive, which debuted the same day as Nirvana's album Nevermind. Swandive was produced, mixed and engineered by Dave Jerden, who has also produced Jane's Addiction, Alice in Chains, Social Distortion, Fishbone, and Anthrax. Bullet LaVolta played a show with Nirvana around the time of the album's release, with the opening act being a then-unknown The Smashing Pumpkins. In late 1991 the band went on tour with Corrosion of Conformity and Prong in support of Swandive.

The band broke up in 1992, the same year Matador Records issued an album of older recordings (mostly from 1987 and 1989) called The Gun Didn't Know I Was Loaded. As of November, 2015, none of the band's releases are in print by any label but Swandive and The Gift are available via digital download. Yukki Gipe was later the lead singer of a band called The Konks and played drums under his given name for Kustomized. Drummer Todd Philips drums in Model/Actress, the band formed by ex-Brainiac bass player and video director Juan Monostereo and former Chamberlain members Curtis Mead and Charlie Walker.

Kenny Chambers reformed Moving Targets in 2018. As of 2026, they are still active.

Bill Whelan died by suicide on November 1, 2021.

== Discography ==
Studio albums

- The Gift (1989) (Re-released by RCA Records with a slightly different track order and some songs from Bullet Lavolta ep as bonus tracks)
- The Gun Didn't Know I Was Loaded 1987 (1991)
- Swandive (1991)

EPs

- Bullet LaVolta (1988)
- Gimme Danger (1990)

Singles

- "Over the Shoulder / X Fire" (1989)
- "Every Hungry Rabbit" (1990)
- "Swandive" (1991)
- "My Protector" (1992)
