= Favourite Spanish Dishes =

1990 EP by The Lemonheads

EP by The Lemonheads
- Released: June 1990 (UK); February 1991 (US)
- Length: 9:29 (UK version); 15:59 (US version)
- Label: Atlantic
- Producer: Paul Q. Kolderie

The Lemonheads chronology
| Lick (1989) | Favourite Spanish Dishes (1990) | Lovey (1990) |

Professional ratings
Review scores
| Source | Rating |
|---|---|
| Allmusic | 2.5/5 stars |
| The Encyclopedia of Popular Music | 2/5 stars |
| Spin Alternative Record Guide | 3/10 |

Favourite Spanish Dishes is an EP by the Lemonheads. It was released in the UK in June 1990 and in the United States in February 1991 with two extra tracks - "Step by Step", a cover of the song first released by New Kids on the Block, and a cover of the Misfits' track "Skulls".

== Track listing ==
=== UK version ===
All songs by Evan Dando unless otherwise stated.

1. "Different Drum" (Michael Nesmith) – 2:50
2. "Paint" – 2:49
3. "Ride with Me (Acoustic)" – 3:55

=== US version ===
All songs by Evan Dando unless otherwise stated.

1. "Different Drum" (Michael Nesmith) – 2:50
2. "Paint" – 2:49
3. "Ride with Me" (Acoustic) – 3:55
4. "Step by Step" (Maurice Starr) – 4:08
5. "Skulls" (Glenn Danzig) – 2:17

== Personnel ==
The Lemonheads

- Evan Dando – guitar, vocals
- Jesse Peretz – bass
- David Ryan – drums

Technical

- Paul Q. Kolderie – producer
- Lou Giordano - engineer
