= Field Trip (band) =

American rock band

- Origin: Pleasanton, California
- Genres: Rock
- Years active: 1980s–1990s
- Labels: Slash Records, Ruby Records, Warner Bros. Records
- Past members: Jim Galbraith, Tom Galbraith, Greg Kinkle, Anthony Quezada, Stephen Laborde

Field Trip was a four-piece rock band from Pleasanton, California active in the 1980s and 1990s. The band's members included Jim Galbraith (guitar/songwriting) and his brother Tom (drums). Their songs were often played on college radio stations. Their third album, Ripe, was released in 1991 on Slash Records and featured keyboards by Faith No More's Roddy Bottum.

== Critical reception ==
In 1989, Jon Pareles wrote that "Field Trip sometimes sounds like other bands - among them the Meat Puppets, Camper van Beethoven and the Descendents - but its fervor, precision and tunefulness are striking." Two years later, he wrote that Field Trip "plays bright, driving songs with memorable guitar riffs". The Los Angeles Times' Bill Locey wrote that Field Trip "...plays sort of countrified folk rock that just keeps getting better every time you listen." A The Hollywood Reporter article wrote that Field Trip's "...main redeeming qualities were its enthusiasm and a watchably hyperkinetic drummer."

=== Individual albums ===
In a mixed review of the band's debut album, Beautiful, Nancy Dingley wrote, "There is nothing particularly new about Field Trip's version of folk/rock: it's that familiar combination of well-mixed, tight tracks and honest, spunky and downright odd lyrics." She concluded her review by writing,

Beautiful contains some musical variety—perhaps too much for most listeners. Nevertheless, the strong folk/rock tunes save the album from being a total disaster.

In the St. Petersburg Times, Steve Millburg wrote that the album "...shows how punk can evolve into something accessible, even catchy, without losing its edge," and described the album's sound as "...pop-punk, or maybe punk-influenced pop, with a touch of country sprinkled in."

Trouser Press's Ira Robbins wrote that "With fine playing and tunes that make fast friends on one spin, Headgear [the band's second album] is a delight." Greg Sandow was less favorable in his review of the album, giving it a B− grade and writing, "Teen pop and knife-edged hardcore rock make a lively, if sometimes dour, blend."

The Chicago Tribune's David Rothschild gave their third album, Ripe, a 2.5 star (out of 4) rating, writing, "Field Trip's energy and enthusiasm are as contagious as a case of the chickenpox in a kindergarten classroom. Too bad the album isn't consistent." A review of Ripe in the Gavin Report wrote that because the band "enthusiastically lay down one bouncy, tenacious hook after another, it's easy, during the course of Ripe, to take the band's excellence for granted- or, perhaps, overlook it all together." Deseret News gave Ripe 3 stars out of 4 and called it "more accessible than the band's previous two efforts", adding that the band "still has more than enough rustic charm to pull off folky rock numbers like "Wake Up Alone" and "Another Lonely Day," which should be a truck-driving anthem." In the Village Voice, Robert Christgau gave Ripe a "choice cut" rating, identifying the song "Ballad of Field Trip" as the only good song on the album.

== Discography ==
- Beautiful (Ruby/Warner Bros., 1989)
- Headgear (Slash, 1990)
- Ripe (Slash, 1991)
