= The Briggs =

American punk rock band

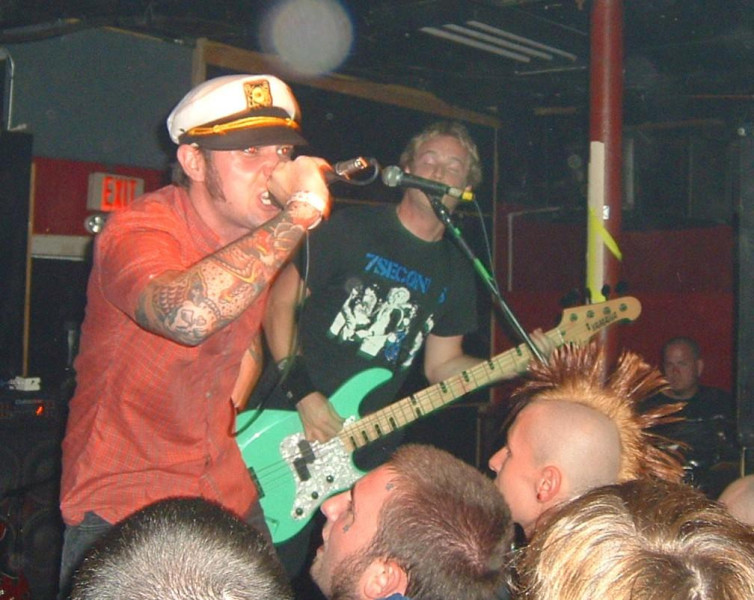
- The Briggs performing in Jacksonville, FL

Background information
- Origin: Los Angeles, California, United States
- Genres: Punk rock; street punk; celtic punk
- Years active: 1999–present
- Labels: Northeast Records; Disaster Records; SideOneDummy Records
- Members: Joey LaRocca; Jason LaRocca; Jake Margolis; Alex Patterson; Adam Porris
- Past members: Matthew Stolarz; Chris Arredondo; Charlie Curtis; Ryan D. Roberts; Derik Envy; Trevor Jackson
- Website: https://web.archive.org/web/20060402220528/http://thebriggs.org/

The Briggs are a punk rock band from Los Angeles, California. The band was formed in 1999 by brothers Joey and Jason LaRocca and bassist Matthew "Duck" Stolarz under the name I Decline. Two years later, after drummer Chris Arredondo joined the band, they changed their name to The Briggs. The band's first album, Is This What You Believe?, was released in 2001. Their subsequent releases included Numbers (2003), Leaving the Ways (2004), Back to Higher Ground (2006), and Come All You Madmen (2008). The band also appeared on several editions of the Warped Tour and toured with punk bands including Dropkick Murphys and Flogging Molly.

== History ==
=== Formation and early releases ===
Joey and Jason LaRocca formed the band with bassist Matthew Stolarz in Los Angeles in 1999, initially performing as I Decline. Drummer Chris Arredondo joined the band, which then adopted the name The Briggs in 2001 after learning that their original name was already taken. In a 2007 interview, Arredondo said that the new name came from a street sign.

The Briggs released Is This What You Believe? in 2001 through Northeast Records, and credits Joey and Jason LaRocca as the principal songwriters. The band followed it with Numbers in 2003, released on Disaster Records, the label of U.S. Bombs' frontman Duane Peters, who also produced the album. OC Weekly ranked Numbers ninth on its 2015 list of the 10 Best Skate Punk Albums of All Time. On March 2004, the Briggs released a split single with Boston's The Kings of Nuthin'.

=== Later releases ===
The Briggs toured extensively during the 2000s, including appearances on the Vans Warped Tour in 2002, 2004, 2007, and 2008, and shows with bands such as Dropkick Murphys, Bad Religion, Anti-Flag, and Flogging Molly. During this period, the Briggs released the EP Leaving the Ways in 2004 and their third studio album, Back to Higher Ground, in 2006, both on SideOneDummy Records. Back to Higher Ground was produced by Joe Gittleman. The band cited The Clash and Social Distortion as influences, and Joey LaRocca described it as the band's "most popular record". Their song "Harder to Stand" was included on the soundtrack of Rob Schneider's 2007 film Big Stan. Their fourth studio album, Come All You Madmen, released on June 17, 2008, was also produced by Mighty Mighty Bosstones' bassist John Gittleman. The album was reviewed by Exclaim!, which described the band as drawing on 1970s punk rock while incorporating elements associated with street punk. Glide Magazine described the album's first half as energetic and infectious, while its second half adopted a more subdued tone and explored themes of mortality and repentance. The song "This Is LA" was adopted by the Los Angeles Kings as an anthem and was played at Kings games. After a two-year hiatus, the band released the single "Panic!" through This Is LA Records in May 2012. In 2015, the band released a self-titled EP, The Briggs (2015, This Is LA Records), and in 2022, Gridlocked: On Tour with The Briggs, a documentary following the band on a ten-day West Coast tour, was released. On September 22, 2026, the single "The Last One Standing" was released.

== Band members ==
Current members

- Jason LaRocca - vocals, guitars
- Joey LaRocca - vocals, guitars
- Jake Margolis - drums, percussion
- Alex Patterson - bass
- Adam Porris - additional guitar

Past Members

- Matthew "Duck" Stolarz - bass, backing vocals (1999–2003)
- Chris Arredondo - drums (2001–2009)
- Charlie Curtis - bass, backing vocals (2003–2004)
- Ryan D. Roberts - bass, backing vocals (2006–2008)
- Derik Envy - bass (2013–2022)
- Trevor Jackson - additional guitar (2021)

== Discography ==
=== Studio albums ===
- Is This What You Believe (2001, Northeast Records)
- Numbers (2003, Disaster Records)
- Back to Higher Ground (2006, SideOneDummy Records)
- Come All You Madmen (2008, SideOneDummy Records)

=== EPs ===
- Leaving The Ways EP (2004, SideOneDummy Records)
- The Briggs EP (2015, This Is LA Records)

=== Live albums ===
- Westlake Sessions (2007, SideOneDummy Records)

== Music videos ==
- Bored Teenager (2003)
- One Shot Down (2004)
- Wasting Time (2006)
- Charge Into the Sun (2008)
- Panic! (2012)
- Punks in Vegas Sessions (2015)

== Films ==
- Gridlocked: On Tour with The Briggs (2022)
