= Turn It On (Gugun and the Bluesbug album) =

Studio album by Gugun and the Bluesbug
- Released: June 8, 2007
- Genre: Blues rock
- Length: 49:10 minutes
- Label: Sinjitos Record

Gugun and the Bluesbug chronology
Get The Bug (2004)	Turn It On (2007)	Gugun Blues Shelter (2010)

Turn It On is the second studio album by Indonesian blues rock band Gugun and the Bluesbug, which later changed to Gugun Blues Shelter and was also known as Gugun Power Trio.

== Track listing ==
All song written and composed by Gugun and the Bluesbug.

No.	Title	Length
1.	"Woman"	4:10
2.	"Who Is To Blame"	3:29
3.	"City Man"	4:31
4.	"Bermain Cinta"	4:19
5.	"Do I Have To Know"	3:20
6.	"Holding On"	4:35
7.	"Spinnin' Around Me"	4:00
8.	"Fallin' Down"	3:35
9.	"Turn It On"	4:40
10.	"Funky Pesta"	4:10
11.	"Decided To Myself"	2:53
12.	"Enam Tiga Puluh"	5:21
Total length:		49:10

== Personnel ==
- Gugun - lead guitar and lead vocals
- Arditya - bass guitar
- Agung Saget - drums
