= Clockhammer =

American alternative metal group

Clockhammer was an alternative metal group from Nashville, Tennessee, active during the late 1980s through mid 1990s, once described as "a cross between Frank Sabbath and Black Sinatra."

== History ==
=== Formation (1987–1992) ===
Originally the brain-child of Vanderbilt University undergrads, Christian Nagle and Matt Swanson, the 1987 line-up consisted of Byron Bailey (vocals, guitar), Nagle (vocals, guitar), Swanson (bass), and Ken Coomer (drums). Clockhammer soon gained a local following, opening for such bands as Firehose, DC3, and Meat Puppets. After an altercation between Nagle and Swanson in the summer of 1988, Nagle left to finish college and the band continued as a trio.

In the early 1990s the trio's music became popular in the college radio scene and many predicted Clockhammer would be a breakthrough success. Bailey's guitar playing would draw large crowds at Nashville's Exit/In, which was "the place" for alternative music in the Music City. Infighting doomed the lineup in October 1991 when Bailey left the band on the eve of a 22-day tour. As causes of the break-up, Bailey cited health problems that made small-van touring difficult but primarily "excruciatingly strained interrelationships in the band."

=== Re-formation (1992–1995) ===
Bailey and Nagle went on to re-form Clockhammer in 1993, with Mark Smoot (bass), and Chris Gallo (drums). Nagle and Smoot had played together in the short-lived project Chainsaw Jazz, and Smoot and Gallo in the group Jaws of Life. This last version of Clockhammer produced only one album, So Much For You on the German label Houses in Motion and it was never released in the US. The label-dictated list of songs was not entirely to the band's liking, and as family, money, management, and other concerns loomed, the group amicably disbanded in 1995.

== Influences ==
Byron Bailey was reportedly influenced by the likes of King Crimson and Cream.

== Post-Clockhammer projects ==
Ken Coomer recorded and was a member of Wilco and went on to produce several projects, including, Latin sensation Chetes, Son's Of Bill, Will Hoge and more. and Swanson with My Dad Is Dead and Lambchop. Nagle was a founding member of the Japanese band, Illuminati, and is now a teacher and author in Tokyo, Japan. Bailey played drums and bass for the short-lived Portland, Oregon band, Vista Bridge. He now teaches English in Poquoson, VA. Smoot continues to record and perform music in the Washington, D.C. area. Chris Gallo plays with Richmond, Virginia-based Hex Machine, a tour-opener for Clutch.

== Albums ==
- Clockhammer (debut album, 1991) (First Warning label)
- Klinefelter (1992) (First Warning label)
- Carrot (CD Single, 1992) (First Warning label)
- So Much for You (final album, 1994) (Houses In Motion label)

== Music style ==
Clockhammer combines metal, jazz, and funk with Byron Bailey's vocals. Bailey's vocal style has been described as that of a "pissed off angel."
