= Klinefelter =

Klinefelter is a German surname, which is an Anglicisation of Kleinfelder. This is a topographic name for a person who worked a smallholding, or a toponymic surname for a person from one of the places called Kleinfeld in Germany. The name may refer to:

- Harry Klinefelter (1912–1990), American endocrinologist
- Henry G. Klinefelter (1843–1910), American politician

== See also ==
- Klinefelter syndrome
- Kleinfeld
- Kleinfeltersville, Pennsylvania
