= Solid Ground (Peter Baldrachi album) =

Studio album by Peter Baldrachi
- Released: December 5, 2006
- Recorded: February 2003–September 2005
- Genre: Rock, power pop
- Length: 35:31
- Label: Prodigal Son

Peter Baldrachi chronology
Solid Ground (2006)	Tomorrow Never Knows (2011)

Solid Ground is the first solo album from Peter Baldrachi. The album received favorable reviews from The Big Takeover, Amplifier Magazine, The Noise, Indie Pages, and The Boston Globe, and was named one of the Top Discs of 2007 by Absolute Powerpop.

In 2008, the track "You're Gonna Miss Me Someday" appeared on Not Lame Recordings' "International Pop Overthrow, Vol. 11.

== Track listing ==
All tracks are written by Peter Baldrachi except “Breakdown.” Words: Baldrachi/Music: Rand.

No.	Title	Length
1.	"Solid Ground"	4:03
2.	"A Better Place"	2:51
3.	"Breakdown"	3:27
4.	"You’re Gonna Miss Me"	3:17
5.	"Wait In Vain"	3:23
6.	"Round and Round"	3:18
7.	"Start It Up Again"	2:31
8.	"Making Sense of Nothing"	4:05
9.	"(Are You Sure That) We Belong"	3:47
10.	"What Do You Want From Me"	4:44

== Personnel ==
- Peter Baldrachi – lead vocals, drums, percussion, backing vocals
- Gary Rand – electric and acoustic guitars, lead guitar, piano, backing vocals
- Alice Austin – backing vocals
- Steve Buonomo – bass
- Lester Goodwine – keyboards
- Richard Mirsky – electric, acoustic and lead guitar on “You’re Gonna Miss Me Someday”
- Karl Mogensen – electric guitar on “Breakdown”
- David Horak – piano on “A Better Place” and Farfisa on “Round And Round”
- Dave Leitch – bass on “Breakdown”

== Production notes ==
- Engineered by K.R. Mogensen
- Additional engineering by Peter Harvey, Tarek Elzeneiny and Corbin Smith
- Recorded at Kissy Pig, Allston, MA
- Mixed by Pete Peloquin at Studio Metronome, Brookline, NH
- Edited by Corbin Smith
- Mastered by Jay Frigoletto at Mastersuite
