= Going Way Out with Heavy Trash =

Studio album by Heavy Trash
- Released: September 4, 2007
- Genre: Neo-Rockabilly, cowpunk
- Label: Yep Roc

Heavy Trash chronology
| Heavy Trash (2005) | Going Way Out with Heavy Trash (2007) | Midnight Soul Serenade (2009) |

Professional ratings
Aggregate scores
| Source | Rating |
|---|---|
| Metacritic | 69/100 |
Review scores
| Source | Rating |
| AllMusic | 4/5 stars |

Going Way Out with Heavy Trash is the second album by Heavy Trash, released in 2007.

== Track list ==
All tracks are written by Jon Spencer and Matt Verta-Ray.

| No. | Title | Length |
|---|---|---|
| 1. | "Pure Gold" | 3:14 |
| 2. | "Outside Chance" | 3:01 |
| 3. | "Double Line" | 3:03 |
| 4. | "Kissy Baby" | 3:23 |
| 5. | "That Ain't Right" | 3:21 |
| 6. | "I Want Oblivion" | 2:02 |
| 7. | "Way Out" | 3:06 |
| 8. | "She Baby" | 2:57 |
| 9. | "They Were Kings" | 4:23 |
| 10. | "Crazy Pritty Baby" | 2:46 |
| 11. | "I Want Refuge" | 1:14 |
| 12. | "Crying Tramp" | 3:28 |
| 13. | "You Can't Win" | 5:00 |

Denmark Version
| No. | Title | Length |
|---|---|---|
| 1. | "That Ain't Right" | 3:21 |
| 2. | "Double Line" | 3:03 |
| 3. | "Way Out" | 3:06 |
| 4. | "I Want Oblivion" | 2:02 |
| 5. | "I Want Refuge" | 1:14 |
| 6. | "Outside Chance" | 3:01 |
| 7. | "You Can't Win" | 5:00 |
| 8. | "Crying Tramp" | 3:28 |
| 9. | "Crazy Pritty Baby" | 2:46 |
| 10. | "Kissy Baby" | 3:23 |
| 11. | "She Baby" | 2:57 |
| 12. | "You Got What I Need" |
| 13. | "They Were Kings" | 4:23 |

Japan Version
| No. | Title | Length |
|---|---|---|
| 1. | "Pure Gold" | 3:14 |
| 2. | "Outside Chance" | 3:01 |
| 3. | "Double Line" | 3:03 |
| 4. | "Kissy Baby" | 3:23 |
| 5. | "That Ain't Right" | 3:21 |
| 6. | "I Want Oblivion" | 2:02 |
| 7. | "Way Out" | 3:06 |
| 8. | "She Baby" | 2:57 |
| 9. | "They Were Kings" | 4:23 |
| 10. | "Kloi" |
| 11. | "Wet Book" |
| 12. | "Crazy Pritty Baby" | 2:46 |
| 13. | "I Want Refuge" | 1:14 |
| 14. | "Crying Tramp" | 3:28 |
| 15. | "You Can't Win" | 5:00 |

Australia Version
| No. | Title | Length |
|---|---|---|
| 1. | "Pure Gold" | 3:14 |
| 2. | "Outside Chance" | 3:01 |
| 3. | "Double Line" | 3:03 |
| 4. | "Kissy Baby" | 3:23 |
| 5. | "That Ain't Right" | 3:21 |
| 6. | "I Want Oblivion" | 2:02 |
| 7. | "Way Out" | 3:06 |
| 8. | "She Baby" | 2:57 |
| 9. | "They Were Kings" | 4:23 |
| 10. | "Didja Hear My Name" |
| 11. | "Kloi" |
| 12. | "Pork Chop" |
| 13. | "Crying Tramp" | 3:28 |
| 14. | "You Can't Win" | 5:00 |
