= Wax (American band) =

American punk rock band

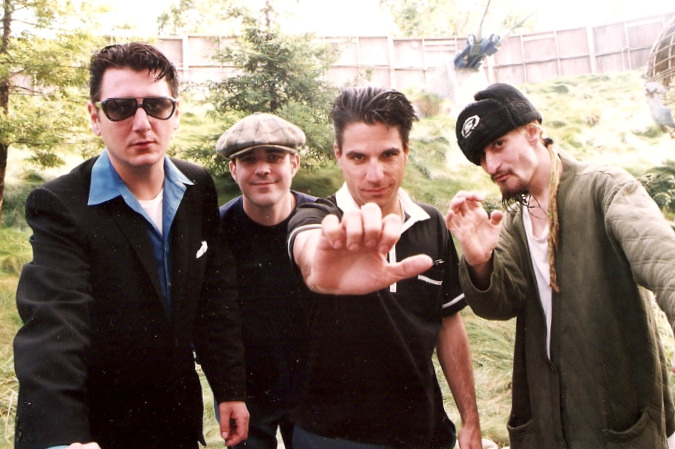
- Left to right: Dave Georgeff, Soda, Joe Sib and Loomis in 1995

Background information
- Origin: Los Angeles, California, U.S.
- Genres: Punk rock; pop punk; alternative rock
- Years active: 1991–1995, 2009
- Labels: SideOneDummy; Interscope; Atlantic; Shattered; Caroline
- Past members: Joe Sib; Tom "Soda" Gardocki; Dave Georgeff; Loomis Fall

Wax was an American punk rock band from Los Angeles, California. Wax emerged during the pop punk resurgence of the early 1990s, and included Joe Sib, Tom "Soda" Gardocki, Dave Georgeff, and Loomis Fall. The band is best known for their MTV buzz clip video "California", directed by Spike Jonze.

== History ==
13 Unlucky Numbers included the single "California", whose music video was later called "infamous" by NME and has been included on Artforum's website. The video depicted a man on fire running in slow motion, and was quickly banned from daytime airplay on MTV. It was included on a retrospective DVD of the director, Spike Jonze, where a still from the video was also shown on the cover of the collection. The video was also included in an episode of MTV's Beavis and Butt-head. The song became a moderate hit on American rock radio, reaching No. 28 on the Billboard Modern Rock charts in 1995.

== Band members ==
- Joe Sib – lead vocals
- Tom "Soda" Gardocki – guitars, vocals
- Dave Georgeff – bass, vocals
- Loomis Fall – drums, vocals

== Legacy ==
"Hush" from the album What Else Can We Do was cited as an influence by Rivers Cuomo for the Weezer song "Say It Ain't So". Jackass co-creators Jeff Tremaine and Johnny Knoxville have met the first time on the music video shoot of the band's song "California", directed by Jonze; drummer Fall would be a regular on the show.

== Discography ==
=== Studio albums ===
Year	Album details
1992	What Else Can We Do: Released: September 18, 1992; Label: Caroline Records; Formats: CD, cassette (CS)
1995	13 Unlucky Numbers: Released: February 28, 1995; Labels: Interscope Records, Atlantic Records; Formats: CD, CS, LP^{[I]}

- I The LP version was issued on Shattered Records.

=== Extended plays and singles ===
- "Who Is Next" (1994) Side One
- "It Ain't Funny" (1994) Side One
- "Who Is Next" (1995) Interscope/Atlantic
- "California" (1995) Interscope/Atlantic
- "Hangin' On" (2009) Side One Dummy

=== Compilations and soundtracks ===
- Mallrats (1995) MCA
- Saturday Morning: Cartoons' Greatest Hits (1995) MCA
- Bio-Dome (1996) Priority Records
