= Hate Your Friends =

Studio album by the Lemonheads
- Released: June 1987 (original LP); 1992 (extended CD reissue, with several bonus tracks)
- Genres: Melodic hardcore, punk rock
- Labels: (United States) Taang! Records (United Kingdom) World Service Records (original release); Dojo Records (first 1995 reissue); Essential Records (second 1995 reissue); Fire Records (2013 reissue) (Australia) Au Go Go Records (Germany) Funhouse Records
- Producer: Tom Hamilton

The Lemonheads chronology
Hate Your Friends (1987)	Creator (1988)

Professional ratings
Review scores
Source	Rating
AllMusic	2.5/5 stars
Spin Alternative Record Guide	6/10

Hate Your Friends is the debut album by the American alternative rock band the Lemonheads. Produced and released on Boston-based indie label Taang Records and licensed for simultaneous release to several other labels worldwide, the album showcases the band's early sound and punk roots. Hate Your Friends is also one of only three albums to feature the Lemonheads' original lineup with Evan Dando, Ben Deily and Jesse Peretz.

== Recording and release ==
The album's track listing has varied from format-to-format and is culled from a few different recording sessions. The seven songs on side one of the 1987 LP show the band as a four-piece outfit, with Doug Trachten playing drums freeing up Dando and Deily to both man their guitars and switch off on lead vocals while Peretz played bass. The six songs on side two were recorded before Trachten joined the band back when Dando and Deily traded duties on guitar and drums. The cassette version contained seven bonus tracks: the three tacked onto the start of side one were taken from the band's previous EP, Laughing All the Way to the Cleaners and the four added to the end of side two were previously unreleased and were also pre-Trachten.

With the 1988 release of the Lemonheads' second album, Creator, Taang launched the group's debut CD as Create Your Friends containing the 13 tracks from the LP version of Hate Your Friends and the 13 tracks from the original Creator LP.. When Taang reissued both albums in 1992 as individual discs, the CD version of Hate Your Friends followed the 20-track sequence of the cassette.

== Cover songs ==
On the album's vinyl version of the album, Ben Deily sings the American hymn "Amazing Grace", which goes uncredited on the album as "traditional," although it is widely known to have been written by John Newton. The cassette/CD bonus track "I Am a Rabbit" is originally by early New Zealand punk band Proud Scum.

== Track listing ==
Songs written by band member indicated.

=== Vinyl LP ===
Side one

1. "Don't Wanna" (Dando)
2. "3-9-4" (Deily)
3. "Nothing True" (Dando)
4. "Second Chance" (Deily)
5. "Sneakyville" (Dando)
6. "Amazing Grace" (Traditional; arranged by Dando, Deily and Peretz)
7. "Belt" (Dando)

Side two

1. "Hate Your Friends" (Dando)
2. "Don't Tell Yourself" (Dando)
3. "Uhhh" (Deily)
4. "Fed Up" (Dando)
5. "Rat Velvet" (Dando, Peretz, Deily)
6. "So I Fucked Up..." (Deily)

These 13 tracks appeared in this order as the first half of the band's Create Your Friends CD in 1988.

=== Cassette ===
Side A

1. "Glad I Don't Know" (Dando)
2. "I Like to" (Dando)
3. "Rabbit" (Proud Scum cover)
4. "Don't Wanna" (Dando)
5. "3-9-4" (Deily)
6. "Nothing True" (Dando)
7. "Second Chance" (Deily)
8. "Sneakyville" (Dando)
9. "Amazing Grace" (Traditional; arranged by Dando, Deily and Peretz)
10. "Belt" (Dando)

Side B

1. "Hate Your Friends" (Dando)
2. "Don't Tell Yourself" (Dando)
3. "Uhhh" (Deily)
4. "Fed Up" (Dando)
5. "Rat Velvet" (Dando, Peretz, Deily)
6. "So I Fucked Up..." (Deily)
7. "Ever" (Deily)
8. "Sad Girl" (Dando)
9. "Buried Alive" (Deily)
10. "Gotta Stop" (Dando)

Tracks A1–3 and B6 taken from Laughing All The Way To The Cleaners 1986 EP. B8 appeared on the compilation LP Crawling From Within.

These 20 tracks appeared in this order as the 1992 CD version of the album.

== Personnel ==
The Lemonheads

- Evan Dando – guitar, vocals, drums on tracks 13 and 16
- Ben Deily – guitar, vocals, drums on tracks 1–3, 11, 12, 14, 15, and 17–20
- Jesse Peretz – bass
- Doug Trachten – drums on tracks 4–10

note: generally, Dando and Deily would sing lead vocals on the songs they wrote. In addition, Dando sings lead on the Proud Scum cover "Rabbit" and Deily sings lead on "Amazing Grace."
