= Ben Deily =

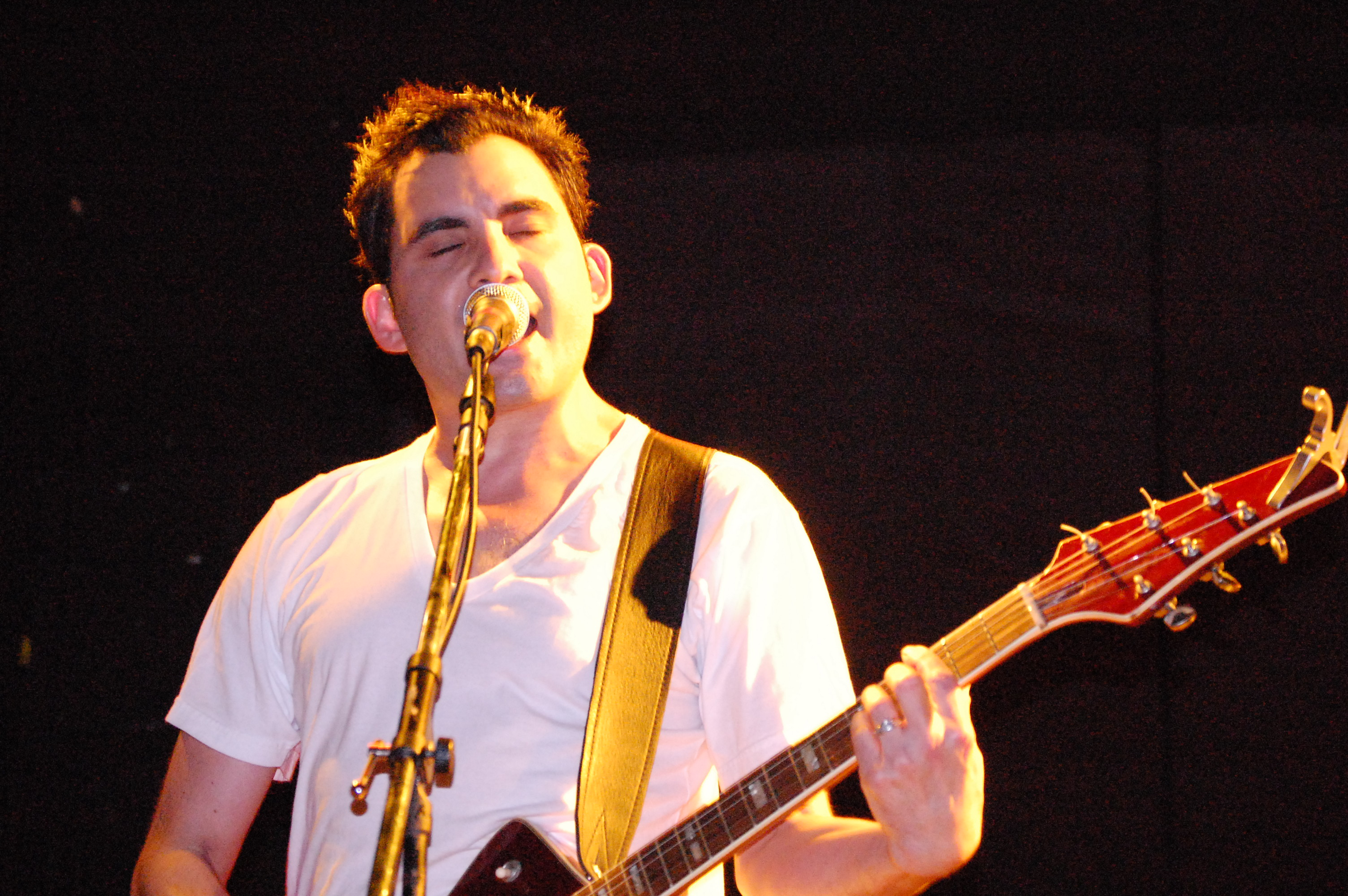
- Ben Deily in 2009

Background information
- Origin: Poughkeepsie, New York
- Genres: Rock, alternative
- Occupations: Singer, songwriter, guitarist; advertising copywriter, creative director
- Instruments: Vocals, guitar
- Years active: 1986–present
- Labels: Taang!, Boss Tuneage

Ben Deily is an American musician and songwriter, most famous as one of the founders, writers and lead singers (along with Evan Dando) of the Boston-based alternative rock band The Lemonheads. Deily and Dando met while students at the Commonwealth School in Boston.

== Advertising career ==
After leaving the Lemonheads to complete his degree in English & American Literature, Ben graduated cum laude from Harvard University in 1994. Since then he has worked in the advertising industry—as a copywriter and creative director—while living in Boston, San Francisco, Los Angeles and Portland, Maine. Deily's work has won several Clio Awards, Addy Awards, inclusion in the Communication Arts Advertising Annual, and other advertising industry honors.

According to The Boston Phoenix, Deily lives and works in the Boston area, where he and his wife Lisa Deily have often performed with their band, Varsity Drag. The Boston Herald reported in 2015 that Deily was placing the band on hiatus for an indeterminate period.

== Post-Lemonheads appearances with Dando ==
Deily's band Varsity Drag has performed with The Lemonheads, sharing a bill with them at New York City's Bowery Ballroom in June, 2009. At the 2010 South by Southwest music festival in Austin, Texas, Deily joined Dando on stage for an acoustic performance of several of their early Lemonheads songs.

In September 2012 it was reported in a variety of sources (The Guardian, SPIN, pitchfork, NME) that Ryan Adams would be producing and playing on a Lemonheads "reunion" album of sorts to feature Adams, Deily, Dando and long-time friend and collaborator Juliana Hatfield. Though it seems that some recording was actually accomplished (per posts to Ryan Adams’ Twitter feed, since deleted) no further developments have been reported.

During 2013, Deily joined the Lemonheads on stage for several shows: first for a single song ("Amazing Grace") in Chicago in April, and then for a short set of songs during a series of dates around New England during July—including the "Outside the Box" festival (where Lemonheads shared a bill with Boston bands Buffalo Tom and The Mighty Mighty Bosstones).

== Discography ==
The Lemonheads

- 1986 Laughing All The Way to the Cleaners EP (Amory Arms/Huh-Bag Records)
- 1987 Hate Your Friends (TAANG!)
- 1988 Creator (TAANG!)
- 1989 Luka (single) (TAANG!)
- 1989 Create Your Friends (special double album of the first two LPs) (TAANG!)
- 1990 Lick (TAANG!)
- 2013 Hate Your Friends, Creator, Lick (Deluxe vinyl and CD re-issues, with previously unreleased archival/bonus tracks) (Fire Records)
- 2014 If Only You Were Dead (2 × Vinyl, LP, Album, containing bonus previously unreleased live archival/bonus tracks) (Fire Records)

Blake Babies

- 1993 Innocence and Experience (liner notes) (Mammoth Records)

pods

- 1992 It's a Bummer About Bourbie, 4-song EP (see It's a Shame About Ray) (Stonerecords)
- 1994 Where I'm Calling From (self-released)
- 1994 are we all set? LIVE AT CBGB, 4/16/93 (self-released)

Varsity Drag

- 2006 for crying out loud (CD, colored 10-inch vinyl with bonus track) (BossTunage)
- 2009 rock & roll is such a hassle: varsity drag live in Europe (CD and digital) (BossTunage)
- 2009 night owls (CD and digital) (BossTunage)
- 2009 live owls: varsity drag live on WMFO (live 'official' bootleg, digital) (self-released)
- 2010 "white cat in a snowstorm" single (digital) (self-released)
- 2013 Untitled Split 7-inch EP (BossTunage)

as Ben Deily

- 2006 all these years gone by: selected songs, 1986–2006 (limited edition double CD) (self-released)
- 2011 "Hamlet” Theatrical Score (prod. dir. by Wendy Lippe, Psych Drama Company, ICA Boston) (SoundCloud)
- 2017 The Night (single) (video and SoundCloud)
