= Where'd You Go? (EP) =

EP by The Mighty Mighty Bosstones
- Released: 1991
- Genres: Ska punk; punk rock; pop-punk
- Length: 13:55
- Label: Taang!
- Producer: Paul Q. Kolderie

The Mighty Mighty Bosstones chronology
Devil's Night Out (1990)	Where'd You Go? (1991)	More Noise and Other Disturbances (1992)

Singles from Where'd You Go?
- 1. "Where'd You Go?" Released: 1991

Professional ratings
Review scores
Source	Rating
AllMusic	3/5 stars

Where'd You Go? is an EP by The Mighty Mighty Bosstones released in 1991 by Taang! Records. It features the title track, "Where'd You Go?" which also appeared on their 1992 LP, More Noise and Other Disturbances. The video for the song was shot in Boston and received minor MTV airplay. The EP also features cover versions of Aerosmith's "Sweet Emotion", Metallica's "Enter Sandman", and Van Halen's "Ain't Talkin' 'bout Love", the last of which was ranked the 27th best punk cover song by Paste in 2017. The EP also has an updated version of "Do Something Crazy", which previously appeared on The Mighty Mighty Bosstones' debut album, Devil's Night Out.

== Track listing ==
1. "Where'd You Go?" - 3:27
2. "Sweet Emotion" - 2:52
3. "Enter Sandman" - 2:58
4. "Do Something Crazy" - 2:13
5. "Ain't Talkin' 'bout Love" - 2:26

== Personnel ==
- Dicky Barrett – lead vocals
- Nate Albert – guitar, backing vocals
- Joe Gittleman – bass, backing vocals
- Tim "Johnny Vegas" Burton – saxophone
- Kevin Lenear – saxophone
- Dennis Brockenborough – trombone
- Josh Dalsimer – drums
- Ben Carr – Bosstone, backing vocals
- Paul "Sledge" Burton – trumpet
- Paul Q. Kolderie – producer
- Max Rose – producer
