= Orangutang (band) =

American rock band

Orangutang was a rock band from Boston, Massachusetts, United States. The members were Christian Dyas on vocals and guitar, Joe Klompus on bass, David Steele on guitar, and Todd Perlmutter on drums. They put out an EP, The Rewards of Cruelty, in 1993 and a full-length album, Dead Sailor Acid Blues, in 1994, both on Imago Records.

Christian Dyas and Joe Klompus were both from Baltimore and relocated to Boston after the break-up of Fiction Bridge, formerly Hour House (no known recorded output under this name) and Clever Lines. Fiction Bridge self-released a self-titled four song EP and Clever Lines released a single track on the Frantic Records compilation 8 Essential Attitudes which also featured exhibit A, a band featuring SONiA of Disappear Fear. Additional members of Fiction Bridge include vocalist Ed Neenan, who now performs under the name e.joseph, keyboardist Paul Hond, now a novelist and drummer Dave Buckner.

== Discography ==
=== The Rewards of Cruelty ===
The Rewards of Cruelty, released on April 27, 1993, was the first EP from Orangutang and was produced for Imago Records. The Boston band recorded it at Inner Ear Studios in Arlington, Va close to the original hometown of Christian Dyas and Joe Klompus. The band wrote all the material for the EP which was produced and engineered by Don Zientara. Paul Q. Kolderie and Sean Slade mixed the EP at Fort Apache Studios in Cambridge, Massachusetts.

==== Track listing ====
1. "Mr. Cimbalista"
2. "Leo Tolstoy"
3. "Untitled No. 1"
4. "S.N.A.F.U."
5. "Gearhead"
6. "Sweet Lemon Maureen"

=== Dead Sailor Acid Blues ===
Dead Sailor Acid Blues

Studio album by Orangutang
- Released: May 24, 1994
- Genres: Hard rock, alternative metal
- Length: 47:08
- Label: Imago
- Producers: Paul Q. Kolderie, Sean Slade

Dead Sailor Acid Blues, released May 24, 1994, was the first and only album from Orangutang. Released by Imago records in 1994 and featuring the minor hits "Shiny Like Gold" and "Bigger Chunk" the record was released on vinyl, cassette and CD. Produced, engineered and mixed by Sean Slade and Paul Q. Kolderie at their Fort Apache Studios.

==== Track listing ====
1. "Slahday & Camus" – 0:39
2. "Bigger Chunk" – 4:15
3. "They All Write Her Songs" – 3:54
4. "The Day Before I Died" – 3:10
5. "Sea of Glass" – 6:36
6. "Shiny Like Gold" – 4:20
7. "Sweet Lemon Maureen" – 4:16
8. "Pontchartrain" – 1:26
9. "Lucky Jad" – 4:39
10. "Daddy Raw" – 4:17
11. "Surf Continental" – 5:20
12. "Surf Epilogue" – 2:03
13. "A.M." – 2:13

==== Personnel ====
- Christian Dyas – Vocals, guitar
- Joe Klompus – Bass
- David Steele – Guitar
- Todd Perlmutter – Drums
- Darren Crawforth – Design
- B.C. Kagan – Photography
- Paul Q. Kolderie – Producer, Engineer, Mixing
- Gail Marowitz – Art Direction
- Charlie Pizzarello – Photography
- Sean Slade – Producer, Engineer, Mixing
- David Steele – Art Direction
- Howie Weinberg – Mastering
