= Satu Untuk Berbagi =

Studio album by Gugun Blues Shelter a.k.a. Gugun Power Trio
- Released: May 2011
- Genre: Blues rock, Pop.
- Label: Off the Records

Gugun Blues Shelter a.k.a. Gugun Power Trio chronology
Far East Blues Experience (2011)	Satu Untuk Berbagi (2011)	Solid Ground (2011)

Professional ratings
Review scores
Source	Rating
Rolling Stone	.

Satu Untuk Berbagi is the fourth album by Gugun Blues Shelter. The album actually the band's double release. This released album officially only distributed in Indonesia. For United States and the European market, a few months later they released Solid Ground, where they use Gugun Power Trio name.

Satu Untuk Berbagi topped a list published by Rolling Stone Indonesia as the best studio album released in 2011.

== Track listing ==
All song written and composed by Gugun Blues Shelter.

No.	Title	Length
1.	"Ikuti Langkah"
2.	"Kandas"
3.	"Seperti Arus"
4.	"Satu Untuk Berbagi"
5.	"Basa-Basi"
6.	"Jangan Berkata Dalam Hati"
7.	"On The Road Again"
8.	"Mobil Butut"
9.	"Putus Cinta"
10.	"She Don’t Need Romancing"
11.	"Give Your Love"
12.	"It’s Time To Rule The World"
13.	"Fallin’ Down" (Live)
14.	"Funk No. 1" (Live)
15.	"Shuffira" (Instrumental live)

== Personnel ==
- Gugun - Lead Guitar and Lead Vocals
- Jono Armstrong - Bass guitar
- Bowie - Drums
