= Solid Ground (Gugun Blues Shelter album) =

Studio album by Gugun Blues Shelter a.k.a. Gugun Power Trio
- Released: October 28, 2011
- Genre: Blues rock
- Length: 62:54 Minutes
- Label: Grooveyard Records

Gugun Blues Shelter a.k.a. Gugun Power Trio chronology
Satu Untuk Berbagi (2011)	Solid Ground (2011)

Professional ratings
Review scores
Source	Rating
Musik Review	(12/15)
Power Metal	9.5/10 stars
Rock Times	Favorable
Hooked on Music	Respectable

Solid Ground is the fifth studio album by Indonesian-based blues rock band Gugun Blues Shelter. The album also the second released under Grooveyard Records and band name Gugun Power Trio. All recording material was recorded in their studio in Cibubur Jakarta, mixing and mastering process was taken by Don Moore in New York City.

== Track listing ==
All song written and composed by Gugun Power Trio.

No.	Title	Length
1.	"Solid Ground"	3:31
2.	"One Heavy Night"	4:05
3.	"Soul On Fire"	4:18
4.	"Vixen Eyes"	4:16
5.	"Mission"	5:54
6.	"Trampled Rose"	7:46
7.	"Silent Rider"	4:36
8.	"I'm Juicy"	5:28
9.	"Funky Chicken"	6:10
10.	"Marching Strut" (Dedicated to Tommy Bolin)	8:16
11.	"Hidden Bonus Track"

== Personnel ==
- Gugun - Lead Guitar and Lead Vocals
- Jono Armstrong - Bass guitar
- Bowie - Drums
