= Heavy Trash =

American rockabilly band

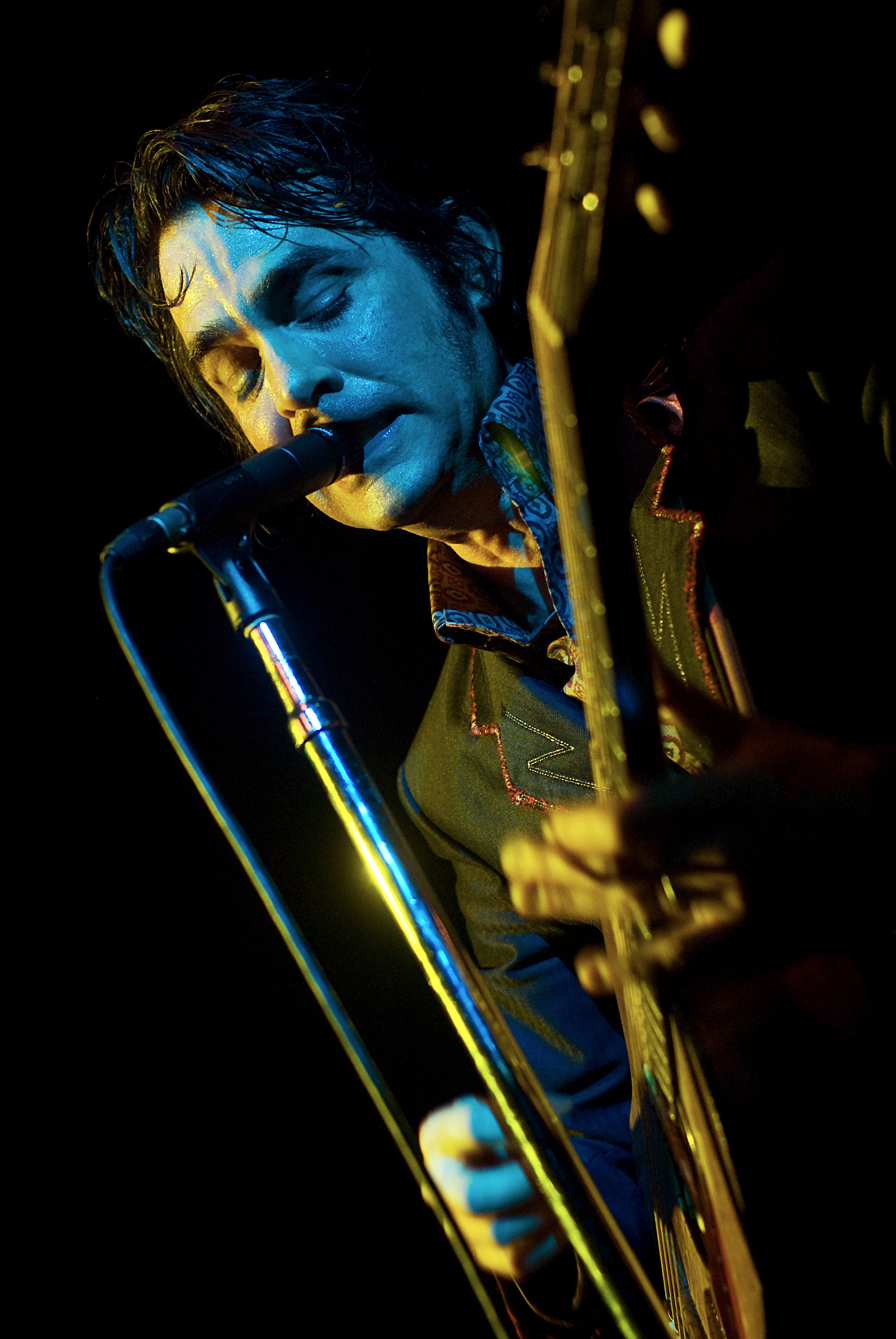
- Jon Spencer from Heavy Trash live in São Paulo, Brazil, on April 23, 2009. Photo by Ariel Martini

Background information
- Origin: New York City, United States
- Genres: Rock & roll, neo-rockabilly, cowpunk, garage punk, garage rock
- Years active: 2005–present
- Labels: Yep Roc, Crunchy Frog
- Members: Jon Spencer, Matt Verta-Ray
- Website: www.heavytrash.net

Heavy Trash is an American rockabilly band based in New York City, formed by Jon Spencer of The Jon Spencer Blues Explosion and Matt Verta-Ray (formerly of New York bands Madder Rose and Speedball Baby). The band's music draws from an eclectic mix of genres, including rock & roll, rockabilly, blues, alternative country, and garage rock or garage punk. They are currently signed to Yep Roc Records, Bronzerat Records and Crunchy Frog Records. They once toured together with the Canadian band The Sadies, under the name of Heavy Trash and The Sadies.

== Discography ==
- Heavy Trash – 2005
- Going Way Out with Heavy Trash – 2007
- Midnight Soul Serenade – 2009
