= Leaving the Ways =

EP by The Briggs
- Released: July 27, 2004
- Genre: Punk rock
- Label: SideOneDummy
- Producer: Joe Gittleman

The Briggs chronology
Numbers (2003)	Leaving the Ways (2004)	Back to Higher Ground (2006)

Leaving the Ways is an EP by The Briggs, and was released on July 27, 2004.

== Track listing ==
All songs written by Joey LaRocca, except where noticed.

1. "One Shot Down"
2. "Waiting in the Shadows"
3. "All on Me" (Chris X)
4. "Dungeon Walls"
5. "Song for Us" (Jason LaRocca, Joey LaRocca)
6. "Top 40"

== Personnel ==
- Joey - Vocals/Guitar
- Jason - Vocals/Guitar
- Chris X - Drums

== Additional personnel ==
- Bass - Joe Gittleman
- Backup Vocals - Mike McColgan & Johnny Riox from the Street Dogs, Bryan Lothian from A Global Threat, Drew Suxx and Adam Shaw from Lost City Angels, and Joe Gittleman
