= Zola Turn =

- Origin: United States
- Genres: Power pop Indie rock Alternative rock
- Years active: 1995–2002
- Labels: Gold Circle Films
- Spinoffs: The Lavas
- Past members: Alice Austin; Julia Austin; Anne Mindell; Rachel Bischoff; Jenn Karson; Jeff Moxley; Dana Shepard; Bob Bihlman
- Website: http://www.zolaturn.com/

Zola Turn was a power pop/alternative rock band from Burlington, Vermont. The band became a hit with its 1999 single "Tastes Like Nothing" off their album Ninja Jane (originally featured on an earlier 7" record) which landed them MTV tours, national exposure and eventually a record deal.

Zola Turn formed in late 1995 when guitarist Alice Austin and her sister Julia Austin joined up with vocalist/guitarist Jenn Karson and drummer Ann Mindell. In 1995 the band recorded "Side Saddle," and got immediate local radio play. In 1996 Ann left to pursue a master's degree in social work and drummer Rachel Bischoff joined. After two more recording projects including Cousin Battie and a self-titled 7" record, lead singer Jenn Karson left the band to work with music and sound in other artistic formats. Alice and Jenn had shared songwriting and lead singing roles up to this point, but Karson sang and wrote a majority of the songs.

The band moved on as a trio with Alice now writing all songs and taking over all lead vocals.

In January 2000, Zola Turn was signed by Randy Gerston, the music-film mogul who had just completed work on the 'Titanic (1997 film)' for Gold Circle Films. They were signed to Gold Circle Enternament, Inc., the parent company of Gold Circle Films, a Los Angeles–based company that was formed in 1996 by Norm Waitt.

Ninja Jane was to be re-mixed and touched up by producer Andy Wallace and then distributed by Sony-BMG's RED Distribution.

During this time, drummer Rachel Bischoff parted ways with the band and was replaced by multi-instrumentalist Jeff Moxley, formally of the Boston band Ms. Pigeon.

In the summer of 2001 to record an album with Flaming Lips producer Keith Cleversley in Chicago. Unsatisfied with final result, the album was printed and then shelved while the band searched for a new direction.

Zola Turn officially disbanded in 2002.

In 2005, two of the three remaining members, Alice Austin and Jeff Moxley, formed The Lavas, a new band with a heavier sound than Zola Turn. Their 2007 album Wall to Wall, was recorded entirely on their own at their studio the Bottling Company.

== Discography ==
=== Albums ===
- Side Saddle, 1996
- Cousin Battie, 1997
- Zola Turn, 1998
- Ninja Jane, 1999
- Queen Tangerine, 2001
