= T. Corey Brennan =

American classicist and musician (born 1959)

- Also known as: Corey Loog Brennan
- Born: Terry Corey Brennan; November 24, 1959 (age 66)
- Genre: Alternative rock
- Occupations: Professor; guitarist; songwriter

Terry Corey Brennan (born November 24, 1959) is a Professor of Classics at Rutgers University-New Brunswick (US). Under the stage name Corey "Loog" Brennan he was a guitarist and songwriter involved with several bands, including Boston-based bands Bullet LaVolta and The Lemonheads, and the Rome, Italy-based Superfetazione.

== Biography ==
Brennan was born in 1959 to Terry F. and Colonel David N. Brennan. He married Antonia Catherine Fried, daughter of Charles and Anne Fried, on 5 January 1991.

Brennan graduated summa cum laude from the University of Pennsylvania with a Bachelor of Arts (A.B.) and was a member of Phi Beta Kappa. A fellow of the American Academy in Rome, he went on to earn a Master of Arts (A.M.) from the University of Oxford and a Doctor of Philosophy (Ph.D.) from Harvard University in 1990.

Alongside his career as an academic, he has pursued a parallel career as a musician with several bands, playing with the Italian band Superfetazione while at the American Academy in Rome, and Bullet LaVolta while at Harvard. Brennan also worked as a Record Hospital disc jockey at WHRB, the Harvard radio station, where he met Evan Dando of The Lemonheads. Brennan, known in those days as "Corey Loog Brennan", toured with The Lemonheads, opening their shows with his own band, Bullet LaVolta and soon after joined the Lemonheads in 1988. A highly accomplished guitar soloist, he continued touring with them until 1991. During this period, Brennan co-wrote the tracks "Li'l Seed", "Cazzo Di Ferro" and "(The) Door". The latter track formed part of the band's sole session for John Peel's radio show, and on this track Brennan assumed lead vocal duties. The performance led Peel to remark "that's the closest we've come to guitar hero stuff in quite a season".

He assembled a band under the name Loog for a solitary album, Meltdown House, which was released in 1995 on the Netherlands-based Survival Records. Contributors included Clay Tarver and Chris Guttmacher (both ex-Bullet LaVolta), Chris Brokaw (ex-Come and Codeine), Dana Everson, Alexis Jimmy Vira and Imke Wagener (ex-Satellite City and latterly a graphic designer).

He was on the faculty of Bryn Mawr College from 1990 to 2000, until joining the faculty at Rutgers in 2000.

Brennan is the editor of the American Journal of Ancient History. As a scholar of Roman and Greek history, Brennan has appeared on several documentaries and television programs, including ones for the Discovery Channel, History Channel, and National Geographic.

He also has been working as a disc jockey focusing on funk, soulful house and salsa music under the name DJ Korenelius.

From July 2009 – 2012 Brennan served a three-year term as the Andrew W. Mellon Professor-in-Charge of the School of Classical Studies at the American Academy in Rome. He currently lives in Princeton, NJ with his wife and their three children.

== Works ==
=== Books ===
- The Praetorship in the Roman Republic: Origins to 122 BC Volume I (New York and Oxford: Oxford University Press, 2000). ISBN 0-19-511459-0.
- The Praetorship in the Roman Republic: 122 to 49 BC Volume II (New York and Oxford: Oxford University Press, 2000). ISBN 0-19-511460-4.
- Wisdom from the Ancients: Enduring Business Lessons from Alexander the Great, Julius Caesar, and the Illustrious Leaders of Ancient Greece and Rome (with Thomas J. Figueira, and Rachel Hall Sternberg) (New York: Perseus, 2001). ISBN 0-7382-0373-4.
- Sabina Augusta: an Imperial Journey (New York: Oxford University Press, 2018). ISBN 978-0-1902510-17.
- The Fasces: A History of Ancient Rome's Most Dangerous Political Symbol (New York: Oxford University Press, 2022). ISBN 978-0-1976448-81.

=== Articles and chapters ===
- ‘Perceptions of Women’s Power in the Late Republic: Terentia, Fulvia and the Generation of 63 BCE’, in James, Sharon L. and Dillon, Sheila (ed.) A Companion to Women in the Ancient World. Chichester: Wiley Blackwell, (2012) 354–366.
- "Power and Process under the Republican 'Constitution'", in Flower, Harriet I. (ed.), The Cambridge Companion to the Roman Republic (New York and Cambridge: Cambridge University Press, (2004) 31–64. ISBN 0-521-80794-8.
- "Principes and Plebs: Nerva's Reign as Turning-point?" in American Journal of Ancient History (2000) 40–66.
- "The Poets Julia Balbilla and Damo at the Colossus of Memnon", in Classical World 91.5 (1998) 215–34.

=== Albums ===
- Bullet LaVolta – The Gift (1989), on guitar
- The Lemonheads – Lick (1989), on guitar
- The Lemonheads – Lovey (1990), on guitar
- Loog – Meltdown House (1995), on guitar
