= Light Your Light =

Studio album by Toots and the Maytals
- Released: 2007
- Genre: Reggae
- Label: Fantasy
- Producer: Zadig, Toots Hibbert

Toots and the Maytals chronology
The Essential Collection (2006)	Light Your Light (2007)	Reggae Legends (2008)

Light Your Light is an album by the Jamaican band Toots and the Maytals, released in 2007. The band supported the album with a North American tour. The album coincided with Toots's 45th year as a recording musician.

Light Your Light peaked at No. 9 on Billboard's Reggae Albums chart. It was nominated for a Grammy Award, in the "Best Reggae Album" category.

== Production ==
The album was produced by Zadig and Toots. Toots duetted with Bonnie Raitt on "Premature". Derek Trucks played guitar on "Johnny Coolman". "Image Get a Lick" lambasts the music industry. The paean to Jamaican producer Coxsone Dodd is followed by a cover of "Guns of Navarone". "Pain in My Heart" is a cover of the Otis Redding song; "I Gotta Woman" is a version of the Ray Charles song. "Celia" was written for a younger fan of the Maytals.

== Critical reception ==
Professional ratings
Review scores
Source	Rating
AllMusic	3.5/5 stars
Daily Mirror	4/5 stars
Edmonton Sun	3/5
The Gazette	4/5
Philadelphia Daily News	B
PopMatters	7/10

The Philadelphia Daily News deemed the album "reggae light." The Sunday Times wrote that Toots "stylishly combines an earthy reggae pulse with more of his delicious old-school R&B." The Daily Mirror opined that "Image Get a Lick" "stands up alongside such classics as 'Monkey Man', 'Pressure Drop' and 'Reggae Got Soul'." The Independent noted that many songs are "delivered in light, acoustic-guitar-based, arrangements that showcase Toots's soulful vocals to maximum effect." The Edmonton Sun stated that Toots displays "his soulful delivery and Otis-inspired pipes on an upbeat slate of poppy, melodic reggae." The Gazette concluded that Toots's "voice is raspy, warm and golden, and the songs are strong, as is the production—never a given with old-timer acts." The McClatchy-Tribune Business News listed Light Your Light as the 9th best album of 2007.

== Track listing ==
No.	Title	Length
1.	"Johnny Coolman"
2.	"Premature"
3.	"Pain in My Heart"
4.	"Love So Strong"
5.	"Don't Bother Me"
6.	"Celia"
7.	"Image Get a Lick"
8.	"I Gotta Woman"
9.	"See the Light"
10.	"Tribute to Coxson/Guns of Navarone"
11.	"Do You Remember"
12.	"Light U Light"
