= Tomorrow Never Knows (Peter Baldrachi album) =

2011 studio album by Peter Baldrachi

Studio album by Peter Baldrachi
- Released: September 27, 2011
- Recorded: May 2009–June 2011
- Genre: Rock, power pop
- Length: 38:22
- Label: Prodigal Son

Peter Baldrachi chronology
Solid Ground (2006)	Tomorrow Never Knows (2011)	Back To The Start (2012)

Tomorrow Never Knows is the second solo album from Peter Baldrachi. The record features many of the same musicians as Solid Ground including both Gary Rand and Alice Austin. Other notable guests appearing on the record include Ian McLagan (Faces, The Rolling Stones, Billy Bragg) and singer/songwriter Amy Rigby. The album appeared on several end-of-the-year lists including Power Pop Action’s 100 Favorite Albums of the Year (#5), The Pure Pop Pub’s Top 15 For 2011 (#8), Power Pop Station’s Top 50 Albums (#12), Powerpopaholic’s Top 25 Power Pop Albums of 2011 (#25), and Absolute Power Pop’s Top 75 (#40).

== Track listing ==
All tracks are written by Baldrachi/Rand except tracks 6, 10, 11 by Baldrachi.

No.	Title	Length
1.	"In the Dead of Night"	3:28
2.	"Make It On Our Own"	2:53
3.	"Promise Me a New Start"	3:36
4.	"When I’m Awake"	2:50
5.	"Pray for Rain"	3:23
6.	"Pick Up the Pieces"	3:47
7.	"Someone Isn’t Me"	4:21
8.	"Lose It All"	3:36
9.	"Now for Good"	3:44
10.	"In the Name of Love"	3:12
11.	"Release Me"	3:24

== Personnel ==
- Peter Baldrachi – lead vocals, drums, percussion, piano, backing vocals
- Gary Rand – electric & acoustic guitars, lead guitar, bass, vibes, piano, backing vocals
- Dave Lieb – piano, Wurlitzer and Hammond B3
- Alice Austin – backing vocals (tracks 4, 6, 9, 11)
- Amy Fairchild – backing vocals (tracks 1, 2, 5, 7, 8)
- Ian McLagan – Wurlitzer and Hammond B3 on “Now For Good”
- Amy Rigby – vocals on “Promise Me A New Start”
- Ian Kennedy – mandolin and violin on “Pick Up The Pieces”
- Aristides Rivas – cello on “Lose It All” and “Release Me”

== Production notes ==
- Recorded at Kissy Pig Studios, Allston, MA May 2009-June 2011
- Engineered by K.R. Mogenson
- Mixed by Paul Q. Kolderie
- Mastered by Ian Kennedy at New Alliance East, Cambridge, MA
- Edited by Corbin Smith
