= American Journal of Ancient History =

- Discipline: Ancient history, classical studies
- Language: English
- Edited by: T. Corey Brennan

Publication details
- History: 1976–present
- Publisher: Gorgias Press
- Frequency: Annually

Standard abbreviations
- ISO 4: Am. J. Anc. Hist.

Indexing
- ISSN: 0362-8914
- OCLC no.: 609930711

Links
- Journal homepage

The American Journal of Ancient History (often abbreviated AJAH) is a peer-reviewed academic journal covering ancient history and classical studies. It was established in 1976 at Harvard University and is published by Gorgias Press. The journal is abstracted and indexed by L'Année philologique. The editor-in-chief is T. Corey Brennan (Rutgers University).
