= Moving Targets (band) =

American punk rock band

- Origin: North Shore, Massachusetts, United States
- Genres: Alternative rock, punk rock, post-hardcore, post-punk
- Years active: 1982–1994, 2006–2007, 2018–present
- Labels: Taang! Records, Boss Tuneage
- Members: Kenny Chambers; Emilien Catalano; Yves Thibault
- Past members: Pat Leonard; Pat Brady; Chuck Freeman; Jeff Goddard; Jamie Van Bramer; Jay Arcari
- Website: https://movingtargets.bandcamp.com/

Moving Targets is an American punk/alternative rock band formed in North Shore, Massachusetts, United States, in 1982.

Formed as a hardcore punk power-trio showcasing the songwriting, guitar work and emotive vocals of Kenny Chambers, the band were an important part of the Boston underground rock scene of the 1980s, although they never achieved a significant degree of commercial success.

The band's first appearance was in the seminal compilation "Bands That Could Be God", released in 1984. The group is often associated with bands like Hüsker Dü and Mission of Burma, who deeply influenced Moving Targets.

The line-up most commonly associated with the band featured guitarist/vocalist Kenny Chambers, bassist Pat Leonard, and drummer Pat Brady - who with producer Lou Giordano recorded the debut album Burning In Water in 1986. Chuck Freeman replaced Leonard on bass for the band's second album Brave Noise. By the time of Moving Targets' fourth album, 1993's Take This Ride, Leonard returned to play bass and Brady was replaced with drummer Jay Arcari.

In 2018, the band reformed for a European tour with drummer Emilien Catalano (of the Nils) and bassist Yves Thibault. A new album, Wires was released in September 2019 on Boss Tuneage Records, followed by a further European tour. The band released their next album, Humbucker, in late 2020.

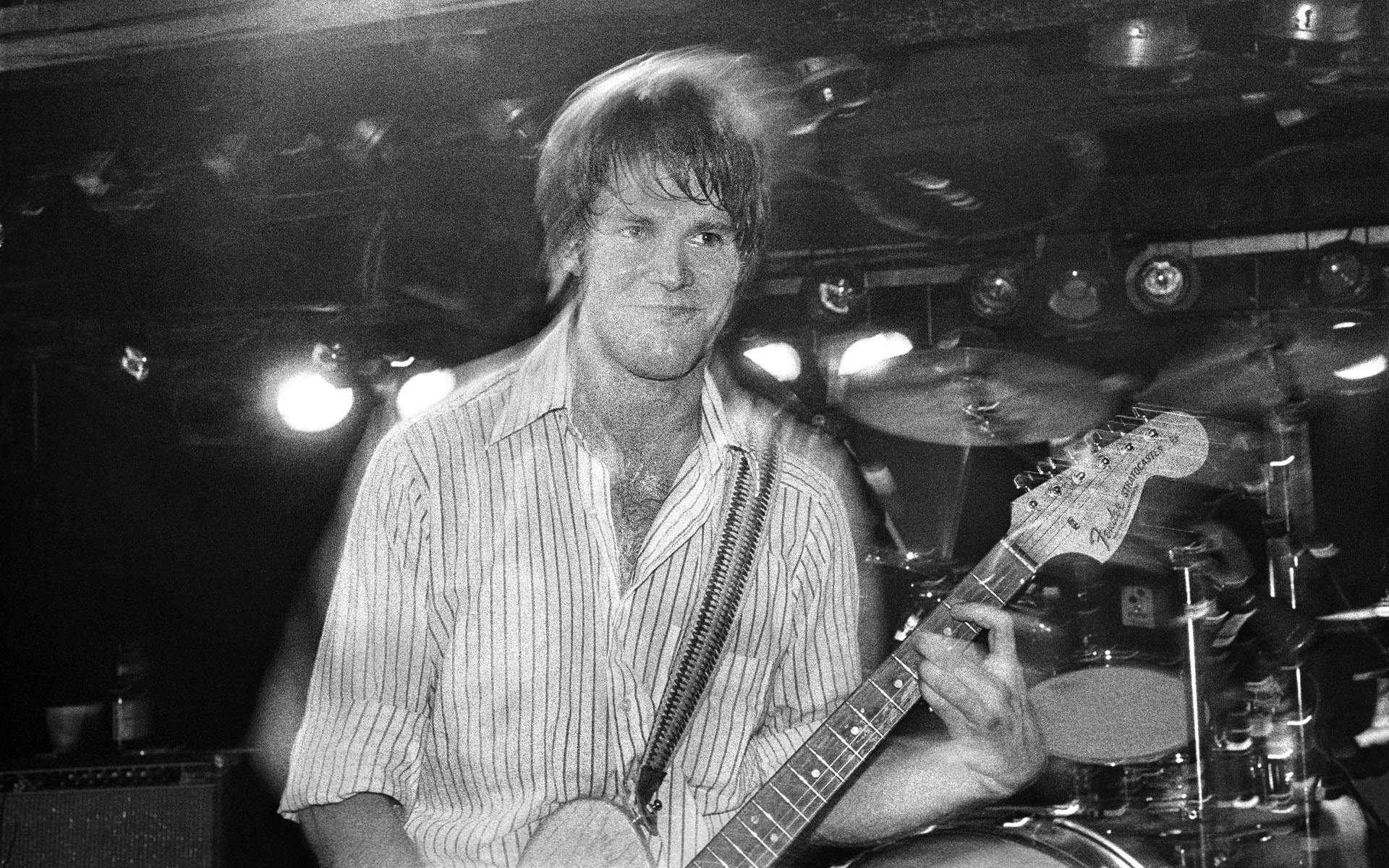
Kenny Chambers, guitarist and leader of the Moving Targets playing at TT the Bear's in Cambridge, Massachusetts

== Discography ==
=== Studio albums ===
- Burning in Water (1986)
- Brave Noise (1989)
- Fall (1991)
- Take This Ride (1993)
- Wires (2019)
- Humbucker (2020)
- In The Dust (2023)
- Red Eyes (2025)

=== Compilations ===
- The Taang Years (2002)
- The Other Side (2016, expanded reissue 2018)
