= Back to the Start (album) =

Studio album by Peter Baldrachi
- Released: May 29, 2012
- Recorded: May 2009–June 2011
- Genres: Rock, power pop
- Length: 44:08
- Label: Prodigal Son

Peter Baldrachi chronology
| Tomorrow Never Knows | Back to the Start (2012) | Slow Recovery (2020) |

Back to the Start is the third solo release from Peter Baldrachi. Eleven of the twelve tracks appearing on the album were released on 2011's Tomorrow Never Knows in September 2011. It was remixed by Ed Stasium, (Ramones, Mick Jagger, The Smithereens, Reverend Horton Heat, Nada Surf) in February 2012. An additional track, “Picture On My Wall” which first appeared as a B-side, was also remixed with additional parts added by Stasium (harmonica, guitar, percussion), and included on the album. The record has earned positive reviews from publications such as The Big Takeover, GhettoBlaster magazine, and PowerPopaholic.

The record also features performances by guitarist, bassist, and arranger Gary Rand, keyboardists Dave Lieb (The Vinyl Skyway) and Peter Linnane (The Farewells), backing vocalists Alice Austin (The Lavas, Stark Raving Mad) and Amy Fairchild, keyboardist and 2012 Rock & Roll Hall of Fame inductee Ian McLagan (Small Faces, Faces, The Rolling Stones, Billy Bragg), singer/songwriter Amy Rigby (solo, Wreckless Eric), multi-instrumentalist Ian Kennedy (Reverse, Dennis Brennan), and cellist Aristides Rivas. Back to the Start was recorded at Kissy Pig Studios by K.R. Mogenson, and mixed and mastered by Ed Stasium at The Kozy Tone Ranch.

== Track listing ==
All tracks are written by Baldrachi/Rand except tracks 7, 11, 12 by Baldrachi.

| No. | Title | Length |
|---|---|---|
| 1. | "In the Dead of Night" | 3:31 |
| 2. | "Someone Isn’t Me" | 4:28 |
| 3. | "Promise Me a New Start" | 4:04 |
| 4. | "When I’m Awake" | 2:52 |
| 5. | "Pray for Rain" | 3:23 |
| 6. | "Picture On My Wall" | 4:57 |
| 7. | "Pick Up the Pieces" | 3:48 |
| 8. | "Make It On Our Own" | 2:57 |
| 9. | "Lose It All" | 3:34 |
| 10. | "Now for Good" | 3:45 |
| 11. | "In the Name of Love" | 3:12 |
| 12. | "Release Me" | 3:31 |

== Personnel ==
- Peter Baldrachi – lead vocals, drums, percussion, piano, backing vocals
- Gary Rand – electric & acoustic guitars, lead guitar, bass, vibes, piano, backing vocals
- Dave Lieb – Wurlitzer and Hammond B3; piano on “Pray For Rain”
- Amy Fairchild – backing vocals (tracks 1, 2, 5, 6, 8, 9)
- Alice Austin – backing vocals (tracks 4, 7, 10, 12)
- Ian McLagan – Wurlitzer and Hammond B3 on “Now For Good”
- Amy Rigby – vocals on “Promise Me A New Start”
- Ian Kennedy – mandolin and violin on “Pick Up The Pieces”
- Aristides Rivas – cello on “Lose It All” and “Release Me”
- Peter Linnane – piano on “Pick Up The Pieces”; piano and Hammond B3 on “Release Me”
- Ed Stasium – electric guitar, harmonica, and Mellotron

== Production notes ==
- Produced by Peter Baldrachi and Gary Rand except tracks 2, 6, 8 and 9 produced by Peter Baldrachi, Gary Rand and Ed Stasium
- Recorded at Kissy Pig Studios, Allston, MA May 2009-June 2011
- Engineered by K.R. Mogenson
- Mixed and Mastered by Ed Stasium at The Kozy Tone Ranch, Durango, CO February 2012
- Edited by Corbin Smith
