= The Mighty Mighty Bosstones discography =

Ska punk discography

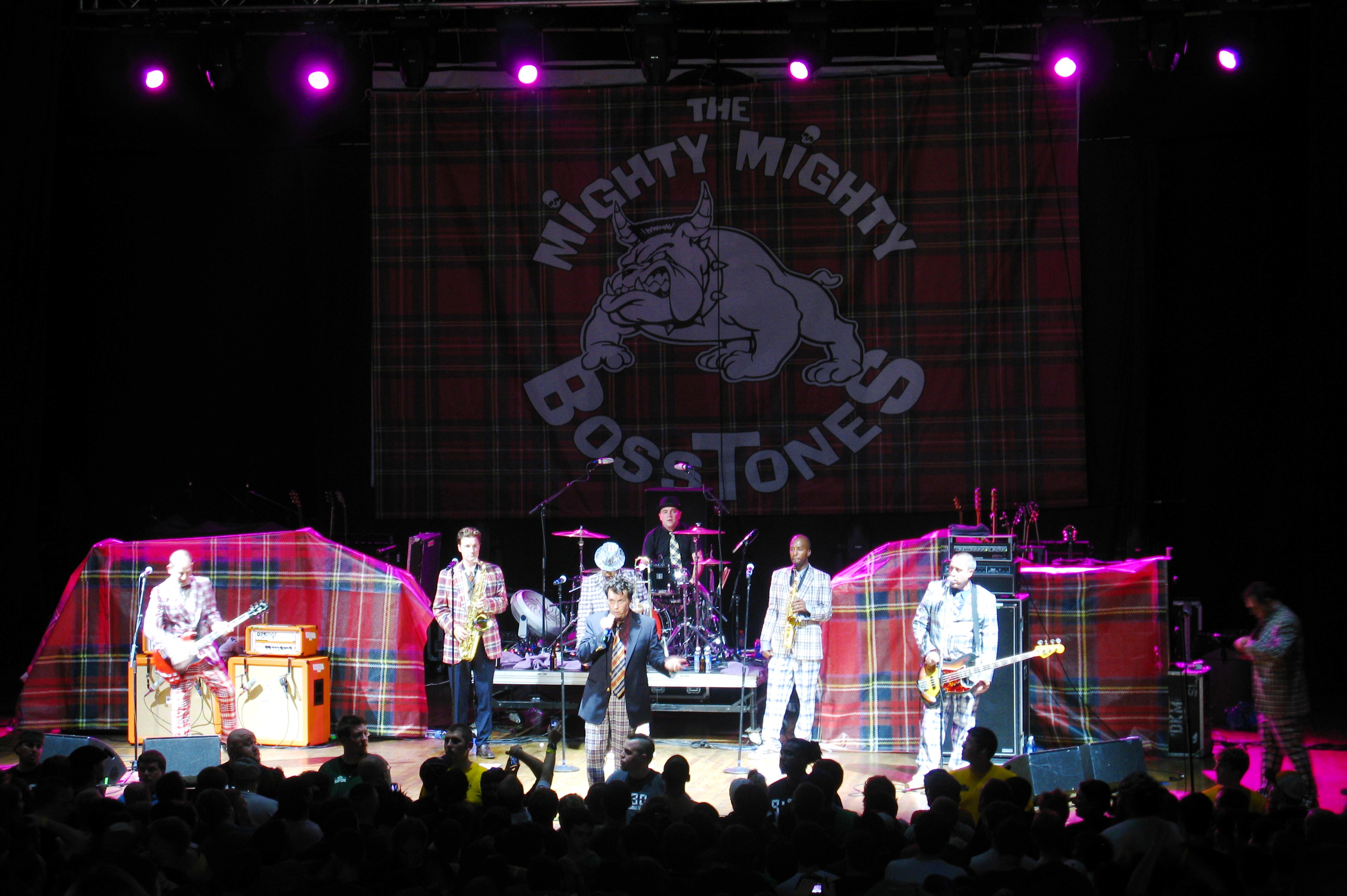
- Studio albums: 11
- Extended plays: 10
- Soundtrack albums: 4
- Live albums: 2
- Compilation albums: 15
- Singles: 22
- B-sides: 1

The discography of The Mighty Mighty Bosstones, an American ska punk band formed in 1983 in Boston, Massachusetts, consists of eleven studio albums, ten EPs and twenty-two singles, among other recordings.

The Bosstones' 1997 release Let's Face It was the most commercially successful album for the band, featuring the hit single "The Impression That I Get", which hit number one on the Modern Rock Tracks chart. Many attribute the surge of ska punk popularity in the late 90s to the single's success. That album earned a gold and platinum certification by the Recording Industry Association of America (RIAA).

== Albums ==
=== Studio albums ===
Title	Peak chart positions					Sales and certifications
Title	US	AUS	CAN	GER	UK	Sales and certifications
Devil's Night Out: Released: August 22, 1989; Label: Taang!; Format: CD, LP, CS	—	—	—	—	—	
More Noise and Other Disturbances: Released: February 7, 1992; Label: Taang!; Format: CD, LP, CS	—	—	—	—	—	
Don't Know How to Party: Released: May 18, 1993; Label: PolyGram; Format:	187	—	—	—	—	
Question the Answers: Released: October 4, 1994; Label: Mercury; Format: CD, CS	138	—	—	—	—	
Let's Face It: Released: March 11, 1997; Label: Mercury; Format: CD, CS	27	27	75	—	40	RIAA: Platinum; ARIA: Gold
Pay Attention: Released: May 2, 2000; Label: Island Def Jam; Format: CD, LP, CS	74	170	—	97	—	
A Jackknife to a Swan: Released: July 9, 2002; Label: SideOneDummy; Format: CD, LP	131	—	—	—	—	
Pin Points and Gin Joints: Released: December 8, 2009; Label: Big Rig; Format: CD, LP, Digital download	—	—	—	—	—	
The Magic of Youth: Released: December 6, 2011; Label: Big Rig; Format: CD	—	—	—	—	—	
While We're at It: Released: June 15, 2018; Label: Big Rig; Format: CD, LP	—	—	—	—	—	
When God Was Great: Released: May 7, 2021; Label: Hellcat; Format: CD, LP, Digital download	—	—	—	50	—	
"—" denotes albums that were released but did not chart.

=== Live albums ===
- Live from the Pit (1997) (radio promo only)
- Live from the Middle East (1998) - US No. 144, AUS No. 168

=== Compilation albums ===
- Awfully Quiet (2001) (UK only collection of songs from the Taang! releases)
- Medium Rare (2007) (a mix of new and previously unreleased material as well as vinyl B-sides)

== EPs ==
- Where'd You Go? (1991)
- Ska-Core, the Devil, and More (1993) (peaked at number #168 in Australia)
- Simmer Down (1994) (promotional only)
- Here We Go Again (1995); packaged with later pressings of Question the Answers
- So Far, So Good (1997) (promotional only)
- A Sample (1997) (promotional cassette only)
- Wake Up Call (1998) (promotional only)
- Selections from the Middle East (1998) (promotional only)
- Toe Tapping Treats (2000) (promotional only; also includes one Sum 41 track)
- The Mighty Mighty Bosstones / Madcap (2002) (split EP release with Madcap released by Chunksaah Records)
- Don't Worry Desmond Dekker (2008)

== Singles ==
Year	Title	Peak chart positions							Certifications	Album
Year	Title	US Air.	US Mod.	US Pop	AUS	CAN	CAN Alt.	UK	Certifications	Album
1991	"Where'd You Go?"	—	—	—	—	—	—	—		Where'd You Go? EP
1993	"Someday I Suppose"	—	19	—	—	—	—	—		Don't Know How to Party
1993	"Don't Know How to Party"	—	—	—	—	—	—	—		Don't Know How to Party
1994	"Detroit Rock City"	—	—	—	—	—	—	—		Kiss My Ass (compilation)
1994	"Kinder Words"	—	—	—	—	—	—	—		Question the Answers
1995	"Pictures to Prove It"	—	—	—	—	—	—	—		Question the Answers
1995	"Hell of a Hat"	—	—	—	—	—	—	—		Question the Answers
1997	"The Impression That I Get"	23	1	19	11	26	1	12	RIAA: Gold; ARIA: Gold	Let's Face It
1997	"The Rascal King"	68	7	—	40	65	4	63		Let's Face It
1997	"Royal Oil"	—	22	—	—	—	—	—		Let's Face It
1997	"Wrong Thing Right Then"	—	—	—	—	—	—	—		Meet the Deedles (soundtrack)
1998	"Lights Out"	—	—	—	—	—	12	—		Live from the Middle East
2000	"So Sad to Say"	—	11	—	—	—	—	—		Pay Attention
2000	"She Just Happened"	—	—	—	—	—	—	—		Pay Attention
2002	"You Gotta Go!"	—	—	—	—	—	—	—		A Jackknife to a Swan
2007	"Don't Worry Desmond Dekker"	—	—	—	—	—	—	—		Medium Rare
2009	"Impossible Dream"	—	—	—	—	—	—	—		Impossible Dream
2010	"2000 Miles"	—	—	—	—	—	—	—		Non-album single
2011	"Like a Shotgun"	—	—	—	—	—	—	—		The Magic of Youth
2016	"What the World Needs Now Is Love"	—	—	—	—	—	—	—		Non-album single
2021	"The Final Parade"	—	—	—	—	—	—	—		When God Was Great
2021	"I Don't Believe in Anything"	—	—	—	—	—	—	—		When God Was Great
2021	"The Killing of King Georgie (Part III)"	—	—	—	—	—	—	—		When God Was Great

== Music videos ==
- "Devil's Night Out" (1990)
- "Where'd You Go?" (1991)
- "Guns and the Young" (1992)
- "Don't Know How to Party" (1993)
- "Someday I Suppose" (1993)
- "Simmer Down" (1994)
- "Detroit Rock City" (1994)
- "Kinder Words" (1994)
- "Hell of a Hat" (1995)
- "The Impression That I Get" (1997)
- "The Rascal King" (1997)
- "The Common Decency" (1997)
- "Royal Oil" (1998)
- "Wrong Thing Right Then" (1998)
- "Zig Zag Dance" (1998)
- "So Sad to Say" (2000)
- "You Gotta Go!" (2002)
- "Don't Worry Desmond Dekker" (2008)
- "2000 Miles" (2010)
- "The Daylights" (2012)
- "A Wonderful Day for the Race" (2018)
- "The Constant" (2018)
- "The Final Parade" (2021)
- "I Don't Believe in Anything" (2021)
- "The Killing of King Georgie (Part III)" (2021)

== Other appearances ==
=== Compilations ===
- Mashin' Up the Nation: Best of American Ska Volumes 1 & 2 (1987)
- Mash It Up: Volume 3 (1994)
- Kiss My Ass: Classic Kiss Regrooved (1994)
- Ska-Ville USA: Volume 2 (1995)
- Music for Our Mother Ocean 2 (with the Pietasters) (1997)
- A Home for the Holidays (1997)
- KROQ Kevin & Bean: A Family Christmas in Your Ass (1997)
- Tibetan Freedom Concert (1997)
- Mashin' Up the Nation: Best of American Ska Volumes 3 & 4 (1998)
- Boston Retroactive (1999)
- Burning London – The Clash Tribute (1999)
- Metalliska – A Ska Tribute to 80's Metal (2000)
- Warped Tour 2001 Tour Compilation (2001)
- A Santa Cause: It's a Punk Rock Christmas (2003)
- The Best of the Mighty Mighty Bosstones - 20th Century Masters: The Millennium Collection (2005)

=== Soundtracks ===
- Clueless (1995)
- Meet the Deedles (1997)
- Elmopalooza! (1998)
- Rogue Trip: Vacation 2012 (1998)
- Digimon: The Movie (2000)
- Step Brothers (2008)
- Diary of a Wimpy Kid: Rodrick Rules (2011)
