= Medium Rare (The Mighty Mighty Bosstones album) =

Compilation album by the Mighty Mighty Bosstones
- Released: December 18, 2007
- Genre: Ska punk
- Length: 40:46
- Label: Big Rig

The Mighty Mighty Bosstones chronology
A Jackknife to a Swan (2002)	Medium Rare (2007)	Pin Points and Gin Joints (2009)

Medium Rare is a compilation album by the Mighty Mighty Bosstones, released on December 18, 2007, on Big Rig Records. It contains three new songs, nine previously unreleased tracks and some rare B-sides. This is also the band's first release since they went on hiatus in 2003.

Professional ratings
Review scores
Source	Rating
AbsolutePunk.net	(79%) link
Allmusic	link
ReadJunk.com	link

== Track listing ==
All songs were written and composed by Dicky Barrett and Joe Gittleman.

1. "This List" - 4:21
2. "The Meaning" - 2:34
3. "Don't Worry Desmond Dekker" - 3:38
4. "To California" - 3:11
5. "The One with the Woes All Over It" - 2:59
6. "So Many Ways" - 2:36
7. "A Reason to Toast" - 2:58
8. "Who's Fooling Who?" - 2:33
9. "Katie" - 3:10
10. "This Time of Year" - 2:17
11. "Chocolate Pudding" - 3:01
12. "Is It?" - 2:52
13. "Favorite Records" - 4:36

=== Song information ===
- "This List", "Don't Worry Desmond Dekker" and "The One with the Woes All Over It" are brand new songs, recorded and produced by the Bosstones during the fall of 2007.
- "The Meaning" and "Favorite Records" are B-sides from the Pay Attention sessions (2000). "The Meaning" was released as a vinyl bonus track on Pay Attention while "Favorite Records" is previously unreleased. It seems to be a song about Phil Spector.
- "To California" and "Katie" are previously unreleased tracks from A Jackknife to a Swan sessions (2002).
- "Is It?", "So Many Ways" and "Who's Fooling Who?" are B-sides from the Let's Face It sessions (1997). "Is It?" appears on "The Impression That I Get" (Australian/UK) single (1997) and The Rascal King (US) 7" single (1998). "So Many Ways" appears on the second UK The Impression That I Get single (1997). An alternate version of "Who's Fooling Who?" appears on the compilation CD Mashin' Up the Nation, Best of American Ska Volumes 3 & 4 (1998).
- "This Time of Year" and "A Reason to Toast" were originally recorded in 2001 (along with other songs that would later appear on A Jackknife to a Swan). "This Time of Year" originally appears on a promotional Bosstones CD given out during the 2001 Hometown Throwdown and A Santa Cause: It's a Punk Rock Christmas (2003). An extended version of "A Reason to Toast" appears on an EP split with Madcap (2001).
- "Chocolate Pudding" was a B-side from the Question the Answers sessions (1994). It originally appears as a bonus track on Question the Answers (Japanese import version), the "Kinder Words" single (1994), and the Here We Go Again EP (1995).

== Personnel ==
- Dicky Barrett - lead vocals
- Tim "Johnny Vegas" Burton - saxophone
- Ben Carr - manager and "Bosstone", vocals
- Joe Gittleman - bass, background vocals
- Lawrence Katz - guitar, background vocals
- Joe Sirois - drums
- Chris Rhodes - trombone
- Roman Fleysher - saxophone
- Nate Albert - guitar, background vocals
- Dennis Brockenborough - trombone
- Kevin Lenear - saxophone
- Dave Aaronoff - keyboards, background vocals
