= Live from the Middle East =

1998 live album by The Mighty Mighty Bosstones

Live album by The Mighty Mighty Bosstones
- Released: October 20, 1998
- Recorded: December 1997
- Venue: The Middle East
- Genre: Ska punk
- Length: 61:17
- Label: Mercury
- Producers: Paul Q. Kolderie, Sean Slade

The Mighty Mighty Bosstones chronology
Let's Face It (1997)	Live from the Middle East (1998)	Pay Attention (2000)

Professional ratings
Review scores
Source	Rating
AllMusic	link

Live from the Middle East is a live album by The Mighty Mighty Bosstones. It was released on October 20, 1998, by Mercury Records. This album was recorded live in Cambridge, Massachusetts, at The Middle East restaurant and nightclub as part of the Bosstones' annual end-of-the-year Hometown Throwdown and is composed of highlights from the five shows the Bosstones played at the Hometown Throwdown that year. The live version of "The Rascal King" is featured in the PlayStation video game Rogue Trip: Vacation 2012.

== Track listing ==
1. "1-2-8" – 3:12
2. "Do Somethin' Crazy" – 2:19
3. "He's Back" – 3:04
4. "Devil's Night Out" – 2:41
5. "Kinder Words" – 2:56
6. "Noise Brigade" – 2:09
7. "The Rascal King" – 2:41
8. "Hell of a Hat" – 3:41
9. "Holy Smoke" – 3:51
10. "Hope I Never Lose My Wallet" – 2:00
11. "I'll Drink to That" – 3:11
12. "Royal Oil" – 2:33
13. "Cowboy Coffee" – 2:09
14. "Doves and Civilians" – 2:32
15. "Let's Face It" – 2:19
16. "Howwhywas, Howwhyam" – 2:25
17. "Dr. D" – 2:51
18. "Where'd You Go?" – 2:47
19. "Seven Thirty Seven/Shoe Glue" – 4:16
20. "The Impression That I Get" – 3:17
21. "Someday I Suppose" – 3:10
22. "Lights Out" – 1:13
- "Doves and Civilians" is a live version of "Drunks And Children" from their debut album Devil's Night Out

== Personnel ==
- Dicky Barrett – lead vocals, design
- Nate Albert – guitar, backing vocals
- Joe Gittleman – bass, backing vocals
- Tim "Johnny Vegas" Burton – saxophone
- Kevin Lenear – saxophone
- Dennis Brockenborough – trombone
- Joe Sirois – drums
- Ben Carr – Bosstone, backing vocals
- Paul Q. Kolderie – producer, engineer
- Sean Slade – producer, engineer
- Howie Weinberg – mastering
- Brian Dunton – editing
- Louis Marino – design
- Adam Swinbourne – artwork

== Charts ==
Chart (1998)	Peak position
Australian Albums (ARIA)	168
US Billboard 200	144
