= When God Was Great =

Studio album by The Mighty Mighty Bosstones
- Released: May 7, 2021
- Recorded: 2020
- Genre: Ska punk
- Length: 58:33
- Labels: Hellcat; Big Rig
- Producers: Ted Hutt; Tim Armstrong

The Mighty Mighty Bosstones chronology
While We're at It (2018)	When God Was Great (2021)

Singles from When God Was Great
- 1. "The Final Parade" Released: January 25, 2021; 2. "I Don't Believe In Anything" Released: March 3, 2021; 3. "The Killing Of Georgie (Pt. III)" Released: April 6, 2021

When God Was Great is the eleventh studio album by the Boston ska punk band the Mighty Mighty Bosstones. It was released in 2021 on Hellcat, the band's only album with the label. The album was co-produced by Hellcat founder and Rancid member Tim Armstrong. The album was preceded by the singles and music videos for "The Final Parade", "I Don't Believe in Anything" and "The Killing of Georgie (Part III)".

== Critical reception ==
Professional ratings
Review scores
Source	Rating
AllMusic	4.5/5 stars
Exclaim!	6/10

AllMusic wrote that "there's a vintage album-era vibe to When God Was Great that feels as if the band have crafted a low-key concept album inspired by their time growing up in Boston, going to punk shows to escape the Catholic constraints of their homes, and, finally, finding a way reclaim the positivity and D.I.Y. activism of their youth in the face of growing awareness of social injustice." The Boston Globe thought that "in 'The Final Parade', they unleash a doozy of a final track, an epic salute to ska featuring members of Rancid, Stiff Little Fingers, Fishbone, the Aquabats, and so, so many others."

== Track listing ==
1. "Decide" – 2:43
2. "M O V E" – 3:17
3. "I Don't Believe in Anything" – 3:46
4. "Certain Things" – 3:42
5. "Bruised" – 3:12
6. "Lonely Boy" – 3:33
7. "The Killing of Georgie (Part III)" – 4:25
8. "You Had to Be There" – 3:42
9. "When God Was Great" – 3:40
10. "What it Takes" – 3:40
11. "Long as I Can See the Light" – 2:51
12. "The Truth Hurts" – 3:36
13. "It Went Well" – 4:33
14. "I Don't Want to Be You" – 3:56
15. "The Final Parade" – 7:57

== Personnel ==
The Mighty Mighty Bosstones

- Dicky Barrett – lead vocals
- Lawrence Katz – guitar, backing vocals
- Nate Albert – guitar, backing vocals
- Joe Gittleman – bass, backing vocals
- Joe Sirois – drums
- Tim "Johnny Vegas" Burton – saxophone
- John Goetchius – keyboards
- Chris Rhodes – trombone
- Leon Silva – saxophone, backing vocals
- Ben Carr – Bosstone, backing vocals
- TJ Rivera – Recording Engineer, Mixing

Additional vocals and musicians on "The Final Parade"

- Tim Armstrong
- Aimee Interrupter
- Stranger Cole
- Angelo Moore
- Jake Burns
- Jay Navarro
- Chris Demakes
- Peter "JR" Wasilewski
- Roger Lima
- Jimmy G
- Toby Morse
- Rusty Pistachio
- John Feldmann
- Laila Khan
- Robert Hingley
- Dan Vitale
- Dave McWane
- Karina Denike
- Christian Jacobs
- Jon Pebsworth
- Ted Hutt
- Freddy Cricien
- Steve Jackson
- Glen Marhevka
- Roddy Radiation
- Jesse Bivona
- Justin Bivona
- Kevin Bivona
- Peter Porker
- Fumio Ito
- Gary Bivona
- Bri McWane
- Sirae Richardson
- Erin MacKnezie
- Jesse Wagner
- Felipe Galvan
- Jet Baker
- Heather Augustyn

== Charts ==
Chart performance for When God Was Great
Chart (2021)	Peak position
German Albums (Offizielle Top 100)	50
Scottish Albums (Official Charts)	92
UK Album Sales (OCC)	80
UK Independent Albums (Official Charts)	26
UK Physical Albums (OCC)	79
