= While We're at It =

While We're At It

Studio album by The Mighty Mighty Bosstones
- Released: June 15, 2018
- Recorded: 2018
- Genre: Ska punk
- Label: Big Rig
- Producer: Ted Hutt

The Mighty Mighty Bosstones chronology
| The Magic of Youth (2011) | While We're At It (2018) | When God Was Great (2021) |

While We're At It is the tenth studio album from Boston ska punk band The Mighty Mighty Bosstones, released on June 15, 2018, on Big Rig Records. It marks the band's first studio album in seven years and is the final part of a musical trilogy that began with Pin Points and Gin Joints in 2009 followed by The Magic of Youth in 2011.

Lead vocalist Dicky Barrett said the songs on the album were inspired by the current climate in politics and it was a driving force behind its poignant and at times, heated sound: “It feels like unhinged hatred. And the wheels are coming off, but not fast enough for me. For me the whole thing is just lies on top of hatred on top of really stupid thinking. So yes, all that is going to get into the music. It has to.”

== Track listing ==
1. "Green Bay, Wisconsin"
2. "The Constant"
3. "Wonderful Day For the Race"
4. "Unified"
5. "Divide"
6. "Closer to Nowhere"
7. "Walked Like a Ghost"
8. "The West Ends"
9. "Here We Are"
10. "The Mad Dash"
11. "Absolutely Wrong"
12. "In Honor Of"
13. "Hugo's Wife"
14. "After the Music Is Over"
15. "He Kept Mum" †

† available only on the vinyl edition of the album.

== Personnel ==
The Mighty Mighty Bosstones

- Dicky Barrett – lead vocals
- Lawrence Katz – guitar, backing vocals
- Joe Gittleman – bass, backing vocals
- Joe Sirois – drums
- Tim "Johnny Vegas" Burton – saxophone
- John Goetchius – keyboards
- Chris Rhodes – trombone
- Leon Silva – saxophone, backing vocals
- Ben Carr – Bosstone, backing vocals
