= Don't Know How to Party =

Studio album by the Mighty Mighty Bosstones
- Released: May 18, 1993
- Recorded: 1992–1993
- Studio: Dreamland (Hurley, New York)
- Genre: Ska punk; alternative rock
- Length: 41:07
- Label: Mercury
- Producer: Tony Platt

The Mighty Mighty Bosstones chronology
Ska-Core, the Devil, and More (1993)	Don't Know How to Party (1993)	Question the Answers (1994)

Singles from I Never Said Goodbye
- 1. "Someday I Suppose" Released: 1993; 2. "Don't Know How to Party" Released: 1993

Don't Know How to Party is the third full-length album by the American ska punk band the Mighty Mighty Bosstones, which was released in 1993. Don't Know How to Party was The Mighty Mighty Bosstones' major label debut on Mercury Records, their first venture away from their original label Taang! Records. The album reached #187 on the Billboard 200, and spawned several singles, including the Bosstones fan favorite—"Someday I Suppose" (#19 Billboard Modern Rock Tracks). Lead singer Dicky Barrett would later state that, "When we made "Don't Know How to Party", no one knew where [we] [were] coming from." Bassist Joe Gittleman stated that the album was "slower than [our] other records."

== Reception ==
Professional ratings
Review scores
Source	Rating
AllMusic	2.5/5 stars

Gregory Perez of the Tampa Bay Times said that the album "packs quite a wallop. While it isn't all ska, as Barrett is quick to point out, it is all Bosstones. Songs such as A Man Without and Issachar maintain the harder-than-calculus anthems that make live Bosstones shows such a brutal pleasure." AllMusic writer Steve Huey explained that "the lackluster songwriting renders this album necessary for diehards only."

== Track listing ==
All tracks were written by Dicky Barrett and Joe Gittleman.

1. "Our Only Weapon" – 3:07
2. "Last Dead Mouse" – 3:37
3. "Don't Know How to Party" – 3:14
4. "Someday I Suppose" – 3:28
5. "A Man Without" – 2:47
6. "Holy Smoke" – 2:52
7. "Illegal Left" – 3:11
8. "Tin Soldiers" – 3:24 (Originally by Stiff Little Fingers)
9. "Almost Anything Goes" – 4:11
10. "Issachar" – 3:46
11. "What Was Was Over" – 2:59
12. "Seven Thirty Seven/Shoe Glue" – 4:32

=== Big Rig 12" Vinyl bonus tracks ===
1. "Someday I Suppose" – 3:26
2. "Think Again" – 1:56
3. "Lights Out" – 0:49
4. "Police Beat" – 2:09
5. "Simmer Down" – 3:34
6. "Drugs and Kittens"/"I'll Drink to That" (Live) – 6:17
7. "Howwhywuz Howwhyam" (Live) – 2:26
- These tracks are re-recordings of the Ska-Core, the Devil, and More EP.

== Personnel ==
- Dicky Barrett – lead vocals
- Nate Albert – guitar, backing vocals
- Joe Gittleman – bass, backing vocals
- Joe Sirois – drums
- Tim "Johnny Vegas" Burton – saxophone, backing vocals
- Kevin Lenear – saxophone
- Dennis Brockenborough – trombone
- Ben Carr – Bosstone, backing vocals
- Tony Platt – producer, engineer
- Brian Dwyer – trumpet
- Molly Ackerman – vocals
- Matt Rice – vocals
- Darryl Jenifer – vocals
- Mike Teelucksingh – talking
- Geoff Hunt – mixing
- Eric Gast – mixing assistant
- Ben Argueta – art direction
- Larry Stessel – design
- Arthur Cohen – photography

== Charts ==
=== Album ===
Chart (1993)	Peak position
US Billboard 200	187
US Heatseekers Albums (Billboard)	8

=== Singles ===
Year	Single	Chart	Position
1993	"Someday I Suppose"	Modern Rock Tracks	19
