= Pay Attention =

2000 studio album by The Mighty Mighty Bosstones

Studio album by The Mighty Mighty Bosstones
- Released: May 2, 2000
- Recorded: 1999–2000
- Genres: Ska punk, ska-core
- Length: 51:08
- Label: Island
- Producers: Paul Q. Kolderie, The Mighty Mighty Bosstones

The Mighty Mighty Bosstones chronology
Live from the Middle East (1998)	Pay Attention (2000)	A Jackknife to a Swan (2002)

Singles from Pay Attention
- 1. "So Sad to Say" Released: 2000; 2. "She Just Happened" Released: 2000

Professional ratings
Review scores
Source	Rating
AllMusic	4/5 stars
Kerrang!	3/5 stars
Ox-Fanzine	Favorable
Rolling Stone	3.5/5 stars
Wall of Sound	71/100

Pay Attention is the sixth studio album by the Mighty Mighty Bosstones. It was released on May 2, 2000, by Island Records. The video for "So Sad to Say" premiered on MTV's 120 Minutes on April 25, 2000. In March and April 2001, the band held several shows in certain US cities as part of a multi-day club tour.

It reached #74 on the Billboard 200 and #170 on the Australian ARIA Charts.

== Track listing ==
All songs written by Dicky Barrett and Joe Gittleman, except where noted.

1. "Let Me Be" – 3:52
2. "The Skeleton Song" – 3:01
3. "All Things Considered" (Barrett, Nate Albert) – 4:01
4. "So Sad to Say" – 3:10
5. "Allow Them" – 3:57
6. "High School Dance" – 2:52
7. "Over the Eggshells" – 2:59
8. "She Just Happened" – 2:53
9. "Finally" – 3:47
10. "I Know More" – 3:08
11. "Riot on Broad Street" – 3:13
12. "One Million Reasons" (Barrett, Gittleman, Dennis Brockenborough) – 3:01
13. "Bad News and Bad Breaks" – 3:33
14. "Temporary Trip" – 2:27
15. "Where You Come From" (Barrett, Albert) – 2:46
16. "The Day He Didn't Die" (Barrett, Albert) – 3:24

=== Big Rig 12" Double Vinyl bonus tracks ===
17. "The Meaning" – 2:33
18. "The Skeleton Song" (demo) – 3:10
19. "Simmer Down" (live) – 2:29
20. "New England Memories" – 2:28

=== Australia CD bonus tracks ===
17. "Together" – 3:05
18. "Just as Much" – 3:01

== Personnel ==
- Dicky Barrett – lead vocals
- Nate Albert – guitars, backing vocals
- Joe Gittleman – bass, backing vocals
- Tim "Johnny Vegas" Burton – saxophone, backing vocals
- Roman Fleysher – saxophone
- Dennis Brockenborough – trombone
- Joe Sirois – drums
- Ben Carr – Bosstone, vocals
- Paul Q. Kolderie – producer, engineer
- Johnny Goetchius – keyboards, backing vocals
- Rolf Langsjoen – trumpet
- John Allen – vocals on track 11
- Paul Scarpino – acoustic guitar on track 11
- Ernie Wilson – bass guitar on track 11
- Bob Richards – drums on track 11
- Nat Freedberg – backing vocals on track 9
- Mark Higgins – musician
- Billy O'Malley – musician
- Andrew Schneider – engineer
- Sean Slade – engineer
- Fran Flannery – assistant engineer
- Ted Paduck – assistant engineer
- Andy Wallace – mixing
- Howie Weinberg – mastering
- Steve Sisco – assistant
- Joseph Cultice – photography
- Bill Horsman – photography

== Charts ==
Chart (2000)	Peak position
Australian Albums (ARIA)	170
German Albums (Offizielle Top 100)	97
US Billboard 200	74

== Notes ==
- This was the last album recorded with guitarist Nate Albert, trombonist Dennis Brockenborough, and the first with Roman Fleysher on saxophone. It was also the band's last on a major label.
- "So Sad to Say", the first single off this album, made its debut at Fenway Park on the big screen on Opening Day, 2000.
- "Riot on Broad Street" is based on the fights between Yankee firefighters and an Irish funeral procession on June 11, 1837.
