= A Jackknife to a Swan =

Studio album by The Mighty Mighty Bosstones
- Released: July 9, 2002
- Recorded: February 2002
- Genre: Ska punk
- Length: 40:30
- Label: SideOneDummy
- Producers: The Mighty Mighty Bosstones, John Seymour

The Mighty Mighty Bosstones chronology
Pay Attention (2000)	A Jackknife to a Swan (2002)	Medium Rare (2007)

A Jackknife to a Swan is the seventh studio album by The Mighty Mighty Bosstones. It was released on July 9, 2002, by SideOneDummy Records. It was recorded over a few weeks in February 2002. This album marked the band's return to an indie label, and was the last album released by the group before their four-year hiatus between 2003 and 2007.

The album title is a reference to both the elegant Olympic high dive and the death of something beautiful. Dicky Barrett has said in interviews that the title of the album upset his mother greatly, as her maiden name was Swan, as well as her mother's.

An earlier version of "The Old School Off The Bright" was originally featured on a promotional EP titled Fabled Barney and The Population given out at the band's Hometown Throwdown in 2002. The promotional version of the album features an alternate version of the song "Seven Ways to Sunday". "Sugar Free" was later featured in the 2006 movie Beerfest.

The track "I want My City Back" is a lament about the loss of The Rathskeller, commonly called The Rat, the club in Boston where the Bosstones got their start.

== Release ==
On March 3, 2002, A Jackknife to a Swan was announced for release in July; it was revealed that the band had signed to SideOneDummy Records. On April 20, 2002, "Mr. Moran" and "Sugar Free" were posted on the label's website. In May and June, the band toured Europe as part of the Deconstruction Tour. A Jackknife to a Swan was made available for streaming the label's website on June 25, 2002, before it was released on July 9, 2002. To promote its release, the band appeared on The Late Late Show and Mohr Sports. On September 26, 2002, a music video for "You Gotta Go!" was posted online. In November and December 2002, the group went on a headlining US tour, with support from Bigwig, Slick Shoes and Simple Plan. On May 21, 2003, the band appeared on Jimmy Kimmel Live!. The following month, they embarked on a brief east coast tour with Voodoo Glow Skulls, the Pietasters, and Catch 22. On June 6, the band appeared on 54321. In October, the band went on a short tour of Germany. In December, the band announced they were going on hiatus.

== Reception ==
Professional ratings
Review scores
Source	Rating
AllMusic	2/5 stars
Alternative Press	8/10
Rolling Stone	favorable

The album reached #131 on the Billboard 200, and #9 on the Top Independent Albums.

== Track listing ==
1. "A Jackknife to a Swan" (Barrett, Burton, Gittleman) – 2:48
2. "Mr. Moran" (Barrett, Gittleman, Katz) – 3:04
3. "You Gotta Go!" (Barrett, Gittleman, Katz) – 2:42
4. "Everybody's Better" (Barrett, Gittleman, Rhodes) – 3:41
5. "Sugar Free" (Barrett, Gittleman) – 2:44
6. "I Want My City Back" (Barrett, Katz) – 3:16
7. "Chasing the Sun Away" (Barrett, Burton) – 3:28
8. "You Can't Win" (Barrett, Katz) – 3:19
9. "The Old School Off the Bright" (Barrett, Gittleman) – 2:26
10. "The Punch Line" (Barrett, Katz) – 3:15
11. "Go Big" (Barrett, Gittleman) – 2:52
12. "Shit Outta Luck" (Gittleman) – 2:57
13. "Seven Ways to Sunday" (Barrett, Gittleman, Katz) – 3:58

== Personnel ==
- Dicky Barrett – lead vocals, artwork
- Lawrence Katz – guitar, backing vocals
- Joe Gittleman – bass, backing vocals
- Joe Sirois – drums
- Tim "Johnny Vegas" Burton – saxophone
- Roman Fleysher – saxophone
- Chris Rhodes – trombone
- Ben Carr – Bosstone, vocals
- Mike Denneen – keyboards, backing vocals
- Rolf Langsjoen – trumpet
- Jim Fitting – harmonica, backing vocals
- Tanya Michelle – backing vocals
- John Seymour – backing vocals, producer, mixing, engineer
- Matt Tahaney – assistant engineer
- Jon Pebsworth – production coordination
- Carl Plaster – drum technician
- Andrew Lenoski – graphic design
- Christian Clayton – cover art
- Josh Dalsimer – photography

== Charts ==
Chart (2002)	Peak position
UK Independent Albums (Official Charts)	45
US Billboard 200	131
US Independent Albums (Billboard)	9
