= Question the Answers =

1994 studio album by The Mighty Mighty Bosstones

Studio album by The Mighty Mighty Bosstones
- Released: October 4, 1994
- Recorded: 1994 at Studio 4, Philadelphia, Pennsylvania; The Outpost, Stoughton, Massachusetts; Dreamland, West Hurley, New York; Fort Apache, Cambridge, Massachusetts
- Genre: Ska punk; punk rock; melodic hardcore
- Length: 40:42
- Label: Mercury
- Producer: Joe Nicolo, Phil Nicolo, Paul Q. Kolderie, Ross Humphrey

The Mighty Mighty Bosstones chronology
Don't Know How to Party (1993)	Question the Answers (1994)	Let's Face It (1997)

Singles from Question the Answers
- 1. "Kinder Words" Released: 1994; 2. "Pictures to Prove It" Released: February 17, 1995; 3. "Hell of a Hat" Released: 1995

Professional ratings
Review scores
Source	Rating
AllMusic	4.5/5 stars
Chicago Tribune	2.5/4 stars

Question the Answers is the fourth studio album by the American ska punk band the Mighty Mighty Bosstones, released on October 4, 1994. "Pictures to Prove It" was released to alternative radio on February 17, 1995.

== Track listing ==
All tracks were written and composed by Dicky Barrett and Joe Gittleman.

1. "Kinder Words" – 3:06
2. "A Sad Silence" – 3:57
3. "Hell of a Hat" – 3:54
4. "Pictures to Prove It" – 3:16
5. "We Should Talk" – 3:11
6. "Dollar and a Dream" – 3:18
7. "Stand Off" – 3:22
8. "365 Days" – 3:10
9. "Toxic Toast" – 3:47
10. "Bronzing the Garbage" – 2:27
11. "Dogs and Chaplains" – 3:01
12. "Jump Through the Hoops" – 4:11

=== Big Rig 10" Double Vinyl bonus track ===
13. "Pirate Ship" – 3:01

=== Japan CD bonus tracks ===
13. "Chocolate Pudding" – 3:02
  - Previously available as a B-side to the "Kinder Words" single.
14. "Patricia (New Version)" – 2:44
  - Previously available as a B-side to the "Pictures to Prove It" single.
  - Original version appears on their debut album, 1989's Devil's Night Out.

== Personnel ==
- Dicky Barrett – lead vocals, artwork
- Nate Albert – guitar, backing vocals
- Joe Gittleman – bass, backing vocals
- Joe Sirois – drums
- Tim "Johnny Vegas" Burton – saxophone, backing vocals
- Kevin Lenear – saxophone
- Dennis Brockenborough – trombone
- Ben Carr – Bosstone, backing vocals
- Brian Dwyer – trumpet
- Johnny Goetchius – keyboards, backing vocals
- Beth Enloe – backing vocals, assistant engineer
- Klotz – director
- Ross Humphrey – producer, mixing
- Paul Q. Kolderie – producer, engineer, mixing
- Joe Nicolo – producer, engineer, mixing
- Phil Nicolo – producer, engineer, mixing
- David Cook – engineer, mixing
- Dan McLaughlin – assistant engineer
- Carl Plaster – assistant engineer

== Charts ==
Chart (1994)	Peak position
US Billboard 200	138
US Heatseekers Albums (Billboard)	4
