= Pin Points and Gin Joints =

Studio album by The Mighty Mighty Bosstones
- Released: December 8, 2009
- Recorded: June–July 2009
- Genre: Ska punk
- Length: 48:23
- Label: Big Rig
- Producer: Ted Hutt

The Mighty Mighty Bosstones chronology
Medium Rare (2007)	Pin Points and Gin Joints (2009)	The Magic of Youth (2011)

Professional ratings
Review scores
Source	Rating
Alternative Press	4/5 stars
The Milk Carton	4/5 stars

Pin Points and Gin Joints is the eighth studio album by The Mighty Mighty Bosstones, which was released on December 8, 2009. It is their first album of all new material since the release of A Jackknife to a Swan in 2002. Pin Points and Gin Joints was produced by Ted Hutt, notable for working with other bands such as The Bouncing Souls, Flogging Molly, and The Gaslight Anthem. Recording and writing sessions for the album lasted from November 2008 to July 2009.

== Background ==
The Bosstones announced that they were working on an album on November 4, 2008, via a MySpace blog with two songs, "The Impossible Dream" and "Next to Nothing" streaming on the page. They took a break to perform a multi-night residency at the Middle East venue in Cambridge, Massachusetts at the end of the year. By May 2009, they had accumulated 20 new songs. They started recording their next album in June 2009; they took a break from it to play four shows on the West Coast and then four on the East Coast. The band announced the completion of tracking on July 29.

Joe Gittleman described the band's approach to the album in an interview: "We really want to make a fun, upbeat record with a lot of cool ska stuff. Songs I look forward to playing at shows." Dicky Barrett added that the songs reflect his "skewed and slightly distorted look at our world and life in general."

== Release ==
On October 19, 2009, the artwork for the album was posted online, and "Graffiti Worth Reading" was made available as a free download. On October 29, 2009, Pin Points and Gin Joints was announced for release in two months' time; alongside this, the track listing was posted online. In August 2010, the band went on an East Coast and Midwest tour with Teenage Bottlerocket and the Flatliners.

== Track listing ==
All songs written by Dicky Barrett and Joe Gittleman, except where noted.

1. "Graffiti Worth Reading" (2:43)
2. "Nah, Nah, Nah, Nah, Nah" (2:21)
3. "The Route That I Took" (3:03)
4. "You Left Right?" (3:42)
5. "Too Many Stars" (2:25) (Barrett, Lawrence Katz)
6. "Your Life" (3:36)
7. "I Wrote It" (3:37)
8. "Not to Me on That Night" (3:18) (Barrett, Katz)
9. "Wasted Summers" (3:18)
10. "Sister Mary" (3:31)
11. "The Death Valley Vipers" (4:15)
12. "It Will Be" (3:22)
13. "The Bricklayer's Story" (2:50)
14. "A Pretty Sad Excuse" (6:22)
15. "Feeling Today" (2:28)†

† available only on the vinyl edition of the album.

== Personnel ==
The Mighty Mighty Bosstones

- Dicky Barrett – lead vocals
- Lawrence Katz – guitar, backing vocals
- Joe Gittleman – bass, backing vocals
- Joe Sirois – drums
- Tim "Johnny Vegas" Burton – saxophone
- Kevin Lenear – saxophone
- Chris Rhodes – trombone
- Ben Carr – Bosstone, backing vocals
