= Let's Face It =

1997 studio album by The Mighty Mighty Bosstones

Studio album by The Mighty Mighty Bosstones
- Released: March 11, 1997
- Recorded: 1996
- Studios: Bearsville (Bearsville, N.Y.); Fort Apache (Cambridge, Mass.)
- Genres: Ska punk; ska; hardcore punk; punk rock
- Length: 33:21
- Labels: Mercury; Big Rig
- Producers: Paul Q. Kolderie; Sean Slade

The Mighty Mighty Bosstones chronology
Question the Answers (1994)	Let's Face It (1997)	Live from the Middle East (1998)

Singles from Let's Face It
- 1. "The Impression That I Get" Released: January 27, 1997; 2. "The Rascal King" Released: 1997; 3. "Royal Oil" Released: 1997

Let's Face It is the fifth studio album by American ska punk band The Mighty Mighty Bosstones. It was released on March 11, 1997, by Mercury Records and Big Rig Records.

The album sold very well due to the success of its single "The Impression That I Get", which reached No. 1 on the Billboard Modern Rock Tracks chart. Also faring well were the album's other two singles, "Royal Oil" (No. 22) and "The Rascal King" (No. 7). The album itself reached No. 27 on the Billboard 200 (the only Bosstones album to enter the top 50). The album has been certified platinum.

Let's Face It was rereleased on vinyl by Asbestos Records in 2013.

== Reception ==
Professional ratings
Review scores
Source	Rating
AllMusic	4.5/5 stars
Pitchfork	7.6/10
The Rolling Stone Album Guide	3/5 stars
Sputnikmusic	4/5

Let's Face It has received positive reviews. Sputnikmusic's Adam Thomas called the album "a quintessential piece of '90s ska" and concluded that it "shows The Mighty Mighty Bosstones at the top of their game and is one of the greatest ska-punk albums to come out of the nineties." AllMusic's Steve Huey also gave the album a positive review, writing: "Even if the production is a tiny bit slick, and the playing time is rather short... it's still difficult to view Let's Face It as anything but a rousing success and easily one of the band's best albums." Stephen Thompson of The A.V. Club wrote that "for every misfire like the preachy title track, there's an infectious anthem that begs to be blared from every window in the city. Play 'The Rascal King' or 'The Impression That I Get' as loud as you can get away with, and ask yourself if the Bosstones aren't back." David Fricke of Rolling Stone was more reserved in his praise, criticizing the album's "flat" production.

In 2004, Let's Face It was ranked No. 36 in a Kerrang! reader poll of the 50 greatest punk albums.

== Track listing ==
=== Original release ===
No.	Title	Writer(s)	Length
1.	"Noise Brigade"	Dicky Barrett, Dennis Brockenborough, Joe Gittleman	2:16
2.	"The Rascal King"	Barrett, Gittleman	2:46
3.	"Royal Oil"	Barrett, Nate Albert	2:39
4.	"The Impression That I Get"	Barrett, Gittleman	3:15
5.	"Let's Face It"	Barrett, Albert	2:39
6.	"That Bug Bit Me"	Barrett, Albert	2:09
7.	"Another Drinkin' Song"	Barrett, Gittleman	3:50
8.	"Numbered Days"	Barrett, Albert	3:10
9.	"Break So Easily"	Barrett, Brockenborough	2:45
10.	"Nevermind Me"	Barrett, Gittleman	3:21
11.	"Desensitized"	Barrett, Tim Burton	2:04
12.	"1-2-8"	Barrett, Gittleman	2:39

=== Japanese edition ===
Bonus track
No.	Title	Length
13.	"At It Again"	2:04

=== 12-inch vinyl edition ===
Bonus track
No.	Title	Length
13.	"Wrong Thing Right Then"	3:12

The track "Wrong Thing Right Then" was previously available on the soundtrack to Meet the Deedles.

== Personnel ==
Credits adapted from liner notes.

=== The Mighty Mighty Bosstones ===
- Dicky Barrett – lead vocals, artwork
- Nate Albert – guitar, backing vocals
- Joe Gittleman – bass, backing vocals
- Tim "Johnny Vegas" Burton – saxophone, backing vocals
- Kevin Lenear – saxophone
- Dennis Brockenborough – trombone
- Joe Sirois – drums
- Ben Carr – Bosstone, backing vocals

=== Additional personnel ===
- Paul Q. Kolderie – production, engineering
- Sean Slade – production, engineering
- Brian Dwyer – trumpet
- Dan McLaughlin – trumpet
- John Rosenberg – keyboards, backing vocals
- Bob Ludwig – mastering

== Charts ==
=== Weekly charts ===
Chart (1997–1998)	Peak position
Australian Albums (ARIA)	27
Canada Top Albums/CDs (RPM)	75
Scottish Albums (Official Charts)	47
UK Albums (Official Charts)	40
US Billboard 200	27

=== Year-end charts ===
Chart (1997)	Position
Canadian Hard Rock Albums (Nielsen Soundscan)	21
US Billboard 200	62
Chart (1998)	Position
Australian Albums (ARIA)	77

== Certifications ==
Region	Certification	Certified units/sales
Australia (ARIA)	Gold	35,000^{^}
Canada (Music Canada)	Gold	50,000^{^}
United States (RIAA)	Platinum	1,000,000^{^}
^{^} Shipments figures based on certification alone.
