= The Magic of Youth =

Studio album by The Mighty Mighty Bosstones
- Released: December 6, 2011
- Recorded: 2011
- Genre: Ska punk
- Length: 36:13
- Label: Big Rig; Rude Records (EU)
- Producer: Ted Hutt

The Mighty Mighty Bosstones chronology
Pin Points and Gin Joints (2009)	The Magic of Youth (2011)	While We're at It (2018)

Professional ratings
Review scores
Source	Rating
AllMusic	3.5/5 stars

The Magic of Youth is the ninth studio album from Boston ska punk band The Mighty Mighty Bosstones, released on December 6, 2011 on Big Rig Records. The album was released in whole mainland Europe on December 6 via Rude Records.

One of the cartoon characters featured on the back cover is a tribute to and caricature of the late "Uncle Frank" Potenza, cast member and uncle of the titular host of Jimmy Kimmel Live!, for which Dicky Barrett was the announcer. Potenza died four months before the album's release.

== Track listing ==
1. "The Daylights" (Dicky Barrett, Tim "Johnny Vegas" Burton, Joe Gittleman) - 2:21
2. "Like a Shotgun" (Barrett, Gittleman, Lawrence Katz) - 3:15
3. "Disappearing" (Barrett, Gittleman, Kevin Lenear) - 3:26
4. "Sunday Afternoons on Wisdom Ave." (Barrett, Gittleman, Chris Rhodes) - 3:36
5. "They Will Need Music" (Barrett, Gittleman) - 3:45
6. "The Package Store Petition" (Barrett, Gittleman, Rhodes) - 3:12
7. "The Horseshoe and the Rabbit's Foot" (Barrett, Gittleman) - 3:57
8. "The Magic of Youth" (Barrett, Gittleman, Rhodes) - 3:10
9. "The Upper Hand" (Barrett, Gittleman, Burton) - 3:16
10. "The Ballad of Candlepin Paul" (Barrett, Gittleman, Lenear) - 3:24
11. "Open and Honest" (Barrett, Gittleman, Lenear) - 2:51
12. "I Should Have Said Something" (Barrett, Gittleman) - 2:44†

† available only on the vinyl edition of the album.

== Personnel ==
- Dicky Barrett – lead vocals
- Lawrence Katz – guitar, backing vocals
- Joe Gittleman – bass, backing vocals
- Joe Sirois – drums
- Tim "Johnny Vegas" Burton – saxophone
- Kevin Lenear – saxophone
- Chris Rhodes – trombone
- Ben Carr – bosstone
