= Devil's Night Out =

Studio album by the Mighty Mighty Bosstones
- Released: August 22, 1989
- Recorded: 1989
- Genre: Ska punk; hardcore punk
- Length: 25:23
- Label: Taang!
- Producer: Paul Q. Kolderie

The Mighty Mighty Bosstones chronology
| Devil's Night Out (1989) | Where'd You Go? (1991) |

Devil's Night Out is the debut studio album by the Mighty Mighty Bosstones. It was released on August 22, 1989, by Taang! Records and was one of the first albums to mix ska and hardcore punk.

== Production ==
The album was produced by Paul Kolderie. Jimmy Gestapo, of Murphy's Law, duets on "A Little Bit Ugly".

== Critical reception ==
Professional ratings
Review scores
| Source | Rating |
|---|---|
| AllMusic | 4/5 stars |
| The Encyclopedia of Popular Music | 3/5 stars |
| MusicHound Rock: The Essential Album Guide | 3/5 stars |
| The New Rolling Stone Album Guide | 2/5 stars |

AllMusic called the album "an energetic, skankin' party album fusing ska with punk and hard rock, with more of an emphasis on ska than the band would show on later records." The New Rolling Stone Album Guide wrote that the album "doesn't blend ska and hardcore so much as it bashes them together." Trouser Press called it "a strong and confident debut."

== Track listing ==
All tracks written by Dicky Barrett and Joe Gittleman

1. "Devil's Night Out" – 2:35
2. "Howwhywuz, Howwhyam" – 2:32
3. "Drunks and Children" – 2:36
4. "Hope I Never Lose My Wallet" – 2:06
5. "Haji" – 2:03
6. "The Bartender's Song" – 2:16
7. "Patricia" – 2:48
8. "The Cave (Cognito Fiesta Version)" – 2:12
9. "Do Somethin' Crazy" – 2:27
10. "A Little Bit Ugly" – 3:47

=== Japan CD bonus tracks ===
11. "Ain't Talkin' 'bout Love" – 2:26
12. "Enter Sandman" – 2:57
- Previously available on Where'd You Go? EP.

== Personnel ==
- Dicky Barrett – lead vocals, artwork
- Nate Albert – guitar, backing vocals
- Joe Gittleman – bass, backing vocals
- Tim "Johnny Vegas" Burton – saxophone, backing vocals
- Tim Bridewell – trombone
- Josh Dalsimer – drums
- Ben Carr – Bosstone, backing vocals
- Davey Holmes – keyboards, backing vocals
- Bill Conway – trombone, percussion, backing vocals
- Vinny Nobile of the Bim Skala Bim – horns
- Mike Costello – harmonica
- Jimmy Gestapo – guest vocals on track 10
- Paul Q. Kolderie – producer, engineer
- Sean Slade – producer, engineer
- Rob Dimit – engineer
- R. Spencer – graphic design, layout design
- Jane Gulick – design
