= John Goetchius =

American keyboardist (born 1965)

- Born: August 13, 1965 (age 60); Boston, Massachusetts
- Genres: Ska punk, ska, swing
- Occupation: Musician
- Instruments: Keyboards, organ, piano

John "JG" Goetchius is an American keyboardist, best known for his work with Boston ska-core band The Mighty Mighty Bosstones.

== Career ==
Born and raised in Massachusetts, Goetchius played keys for a number of Boston bands throughout the 1980s and 1990s, including The Dogmatics, Matweeds and Atomic Cocktail. He was also a member of the ska band Mission Impossible, who made their recorded debut alongside The Mighty Mighty Bosstones on the 1987 ska compilation Mash It Up!. Goetchius first recorded with the Bosstones on their 1995 album Question the Answers, and since continues to contribute keyboards for the band's albums and occasionally their live shows. He recorded organ for the majority of tracks on the Bosstones' 2009 album Pin Points and Gin Joints and has recently made continued appearances in the band's concerts, television performances and publicity photos, though has not yet been confirmed as an official member.

In 1998, Goetchius joined the Oregon ska-swing band and former Bosstones tourmates the Cherry Poppin' Daddies following the departure of their previous keyboardist Dustin Lanker. Goetchius served as a member of the Daddies during the peak of the band's commercial popularity, recording on much of their Soul Caddy album until Lanker's return in early 2000.

== Discography ==
=== The Mighty Mighty Bosstones ===
- Question the Answers (1995) – organ, piano
- Pay Attention (2000) – keyboards
- Pin Points and Gin Joints (2009) – organ, keyboards, piano
- The Magic of Youth (2011) – piano, Hammond organ
- While We're At It (2018) - keyboards
- When God Was Great (2021) - keyboards

=== Cherry Poppin' Daddies ===
- Soul Caddy (2000) – keyboards, backing vocals

=== Miscellaneous ===
- The Dogmatics – Everybody Does It (1986) – keyboards
- Mission Impossible – Mash It Up! compilation (1987) – keyboards
- Mission Impossible – Ska-Ville USA Vol. 2 compilation (1987) – keyboards, producer
- The Matweeds – Rock Turns to Stone compilation (1988) – keyboards
- Atomic Cocktail – Pushing The Norton: The Ace Cafe Compilation (1994) – piano
- Pat Johnson – Invisible Juan (1997) – keyboards
