= Frank Potenza =

American police officer (1933–2011)

- Born: Francis Potenza; November 11, 1933; Brooklyn, New York City, U.S.
- Died: August 23, 2011 (aged 77); Los Angeles, California, U.S.
- Other name: Uncle Frank
- Known for: Jimmy Kimmel Live!
- Children: 3
- Relatives: Jimmy Kimmel (nephew); Jonathan Kimmel (nephew); Sal Iacono (nephew)

Francis Potenza (November 11, 1933 – August 23, 2011) was a police officer in the New York City Police Department and also a security guard. He later became a recurring staple on his nephew Jimmy Kimmel’s show late-night show Jimmy Kimmel Live! from their show’s premiere in 2003 until his death in 2011.

== Early life and career ==
Francis Potenza was born in Brooklyn, New York City, in 1933. He served in the United States Army during the Korean War. Potenza joined the New York Police Department (NYPD) following the war, serving as a beat cop in Bensonhurst, Brooklyn, in the 62nd Precinct for 20 years. He reportedly made just six arrests during his two decades in the NYPD, believing that a lecture by the police delivered more benefits than a prison sentence.

He became a security guard and moved to Las Vegas upon his retirement from the NYPD. He served inside Frank Sinatra's personal security detail and as bodyguard when Sinatra performed at Caesars Palace. He returned to New York City to take a security position at St. Patrick's Cathedral in Manhattan.

== Role on Jimmy Kimmel Live! ==
Potenza had worked in security for more than ten years in New York City and Las Vegas when his nephew, comedian Jimmy Kimmel, asked him in 2003 to join his late-night talk show, Jimmy Kimmel Live!. Potenza, who was still working security at St. Patrick's Cathedral at the time, accepted Kimmel's offer and moved to southern California.

Potenza was ostensibly employed as a security guard on the show, but perhaps more significantly he was a regular on-camera presence (usually in his security guard uniform). He was introduced to audiences as Kimmel's "Uncle Frank", serving as a comic foil to the late-night host and participating in sketches and comedic pieces. Potenza appeared on the show for eight years from 2003 to 2011. Uncle Frank quickly developed his own fan following, with Kimmel noting in 2007, "People can tell that Uncle Frank is the genuine article... That's why they like him."

In one ongoing comic piece, Potenza was teamed with his former wife (and Kimmel's aunt), Concetta ("Chippy"), for a series of tasks ranging from self defense lessons to dairy farming. Potenza was also paired with Guillermo Rodriguez, the show's parking lot security guard, and Veatrice Rice, another security guard for the show, in various appearances for comedic effect. Rice died of cancer on January 21, 2009.

== Death and tributes ==
Potenza died from cancer in Los Angeles on August 23, 2011, aged 77. He was survived by his ex-wife, three daughters, and a granddaughter. He was married to Chippy for more than 28 years before their divorce. His memorial service was held in Las Vegas. In a Twitter message, Kimmel thanked Potenza's fans, tweeting, "Thank you for your kind words about a very kind man" and "RIP Uncle Frank, his comic timing took a lifetime to earn. Today I eat cake for him."

The show was on summer hiatus at the time of Potenza's death and was scheduled to return on September 6, 2011. On September 6, Kimmel aired a special tribute episode to Uncle Frank, with an interview with Frank's favorite guest, Don Rickles. A caricature of Uncle Frank appears in tribute on the back cover of the Mighty Mighty Bosstones' album The Magic of Youth, released on December 16, 2011 (the Bosstones' lead singer, Dicky Barrett, was the announcer for Jimmy Kimmel Live!).
