= Guillermo Rodriguez (comedian) =

Mexican-American talk show personality (born 1971)

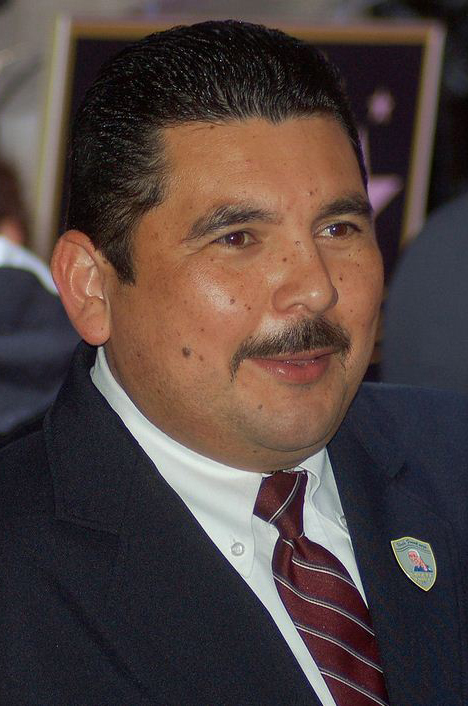
- Rodriguez in 2013
- Born: January 27, 1971 (age 55); Zacatecas City, Mexico
- Citizenship: Mexico; United States (since 2005)
- Occupations: TV personality; comedian
- Years active: 2003–present
- Known for: Jimmy Kimmel Live!
- Children: 1

Guillermo Rodriguez (born January 27, 1971) is a Mexican and American talk show personality and comedian best known as the sidekick to Jimmy Kimmel on the American late night talk show Jimmy Kimmel Live!. He rose to fame while working as a parking lot security guard at the Hollywood Boulevard Masonic Temple studio. He continues in character and title as the show's security guard.

== Career ==
=== Jimmy Kimmel Live! (2003–present) ===
Rodriguez began working as a parking lot security guard for the Jimmy Kimmel Live! studio in 2003. At that time he also had a second full-time job as a hotel room server as well as working a third job during weekends. After he was caught sleeping in announcer Dicky Barrett's car, Kimmel offered to have him appear on the show. Due to his shyness at the time, Rodriguez initially turned down the offer to appear on the show in 2003 but was talked into it by one of the producers.

His early appearances were with "Uncle Frank" Potenza in a series of bits called "Security Night Live". (Potenza had originally handled security for the show before his role was expanded to appear on screen.) Rodriguez soon moved to acting in skits on the show, with his first role being Michael Jackson's Spanish cook. His broken English coupled with his affability earned him a high-profile supporting role as a personality on the show, in which he usually plays the everyman. Rodriguez took over main red-carpet interviewing duties in 2011 after Potenza died. In 2019, Rodriguez was made an honorary citizen of the city of Dildo, Newfoundland and Labrador when Jimmy Kimmel was elected as honorary mayor.

=== Dancing with the Stars (2026) ===
Rodriguez appeared on season 35 of the reality dance competition series Dancing with the Stars, paired with professional dancer Witney Carson. Rodriguez and Carson competed until their elimination in week five. Rodriguez was the lowest-scoring contestant throughout the season, but received support from fans.

== Personal life ==
Rodriguez was born in Zacatecas, Mexico. He is married and has a son Juan. He became a U.S. citizen in 2005. He is currently a resident of California.

In 2026, Rodriguez launched a fresh refrigerated salsa brand, Guillermo's Salsa, with Ithaca Hummus founder Chris Kirby.

== Filmography ==
=== Film ===
Year	Title	Role	Notes	Refs.
2009	Rock Slyde	Gary		
2017	Guardians of the Galaxy Vol. 2	Cop #2	Uncredited cameo appearance	
2020	Bill & Ted Face the Music	Himself	Cameo appearance	
2023	Ezra	Himself	Uncredited cameo appearance	
2026	In Memoriam	Himself		

=== Television ===
Year	Title	Role	Notes	Refs.
2003–present	Jimmy Kimmel Live!	Himself		
2019	The Little Mermaid Live!	Blowfish		
2026	Dancing with the Stars	Contestant, 11th Place	Season 35	
