= The Rascal King =

The Rascal King may refer to:

- The Rascal King, a nickname of James Michael Curley (1874–1958), four times mayor of Boston, US
- "The Rascal King" (song), a song by the Mighty Mighty Bosstones, inspired by Curley
