= The Rascal King (song) =

1997 single by the Mighty Mighty Bosstones

Single by the Mighty Mighty Bosstones

from the album Let's Face It
- Released: 1997
- Length: 2:46
- Label: Mercury
- Songwriters: The Mighty Mighty Bosstones; Dicky Barrett; Joe Gittleman; Nate Albert
- Producers: Sean Slade; Paul Q. Kolderie; the Mighty Mighty Bosstones

The Mighty Mighty Bosstones singles chronology
"The Impression That I Get" (1997)	"The Rascal King" (1997)	"Royal Oil" (1997)

Music video
- "The Rascal King" on YouTube

"The Rascal King" is a song by the Mighty Mighty Bosstones and the second single from their 1997 studio album, Let's Face It. "The Rascal King," the follow-up to the lead single, "The Impression That I Get," reached number seven on the US Billboard Modern Rock Tracks chart and number four on the Canadian RPM Alternative 30.

== Inspiration ==
The song was inspired by James Michael Curley, a former Mayor of Boston and Governor of Massachusetts.

== Charts ==
=== Weekly charts ===
Chart (1997–1998)	Peak position
Australia (ARIA)	40
Canada Rock/Alternative (RPM)	4
Scottish Singles Sales (Official Charts)	52
UK Singles (Official Charts)	63
US Hot 100 Airplay (Billboard)	68
US Modern Rock Tracks (Billboard)	7

=== Year-end charts ===
Chart (1997)	Position
Canada Rock/Alternative (RPM)	35
US Modern Rock Tracks (Billboard)	42
