= The Dogmatics =

American rock band

The Dogmatics are a rock band from Boston, Massachusetts, United States, formed in the 1980s. They still play local venues and released their first new recordings in over 30 years on Rum Bar Records in 2019.

== Biography ==
The band was formed in Boston by Paul O'Halloran, his twin brother Pete, longtime friend Jerry Lehane, cousin of the crime fiction author Dennis Lehane, who had known the brothers since first grade at St. Matthew's Catholic school in Dorchester, Massachusetts some years earlier, and Dan Shannon on drums. The band played one show under the name "Guttersnipes" at their loft on Boston's Thayer Street, before renaming themselves as The Dogmatics, playing their first show under this name at Cantones in 1981. They played throughout Boston for the next year, before Shannon went to college and was replaced by 18-year-old Thomas Long.

In 1984, the Dogmatics released their first and only single on their own label Cat Records, with "Gimme the Shakes" on the A-side and a cover of Eddie Cochran's "20 Flight Rock" on the B-side. The single was played on WMBR, WERS, and other local college radio stations. In 1985, the Dogmatics signed with Homestead Records and released their first album, Thayer Street, which made the cover of the College Music Journal. Following this exposure, the band got a manager and a booking agent and began touring the United States, playing with The Replacements, Young Fresh Fellows, Los Lobos, The Bangles, The Fleshtones, Dash Rip Rock, Del Fuegos, Scruffy the Cat, Dinosaur Jr., Long Ryders, Forgotten Rebels, Lyres, and Neats. Their second LP, Everybody Does It, recorded in the summer of 1985, was delivered to Homestead Records in December, but release was delayed until June 1986. The singles "Teenager on Drugs" and "Teenage Girls" were released on the Mr. Beautiful and Rock Turns to Stone compilations, respectively. "It Sure Don't Feel Like Xmas Time" was featured on the Midnite Xmas Mess compilation. On October 23, 1986, Paul O'Halloran died in a motorcycle accident. Since then, his brothers Jimmy and Johnny have often played bass at the band's live shows.

In 1998, Shredder/Vagrant released the band's two LPs with previously unreleased tracks. The Mighty Mighty Bosstones recorded "It Sure Don't Feel Like Xmas Time" in 1997 for Mercury Records compilation Home for the Holidays, a benefit record for the nonprofit organization Phoenix House. The Dogmatics recorded Richie Parsons' track "Summertime" for the Unnatural Axe Tribute record Ruling the World from the Backseat in 2008 on Lawless Records, and also contributed to the Reducers tribute record Rave On in 2012 with "Black Plastic Shoes". The band's tracks still receive airplay on XM Radio and in Boston on MIT radio WMBR.

== Band members ==
- Peter O'Halloran – guitar, vocals
- Paul O'Halloran – bass, vocals
- Jerry Lehane – guitar, Vocals
- Tommy Long – drums
- Dan Shannon (1981–1982) – drums
- John Goetchius (1986)
- Jimmy O'Halloran (1986–present) – bass, vocals
- Johnny O'Halloran (1986–present) – bass, vocals
- James Young (2019–present) – mandolin, vocals
