= The Defiant (band) =

American punk rock band

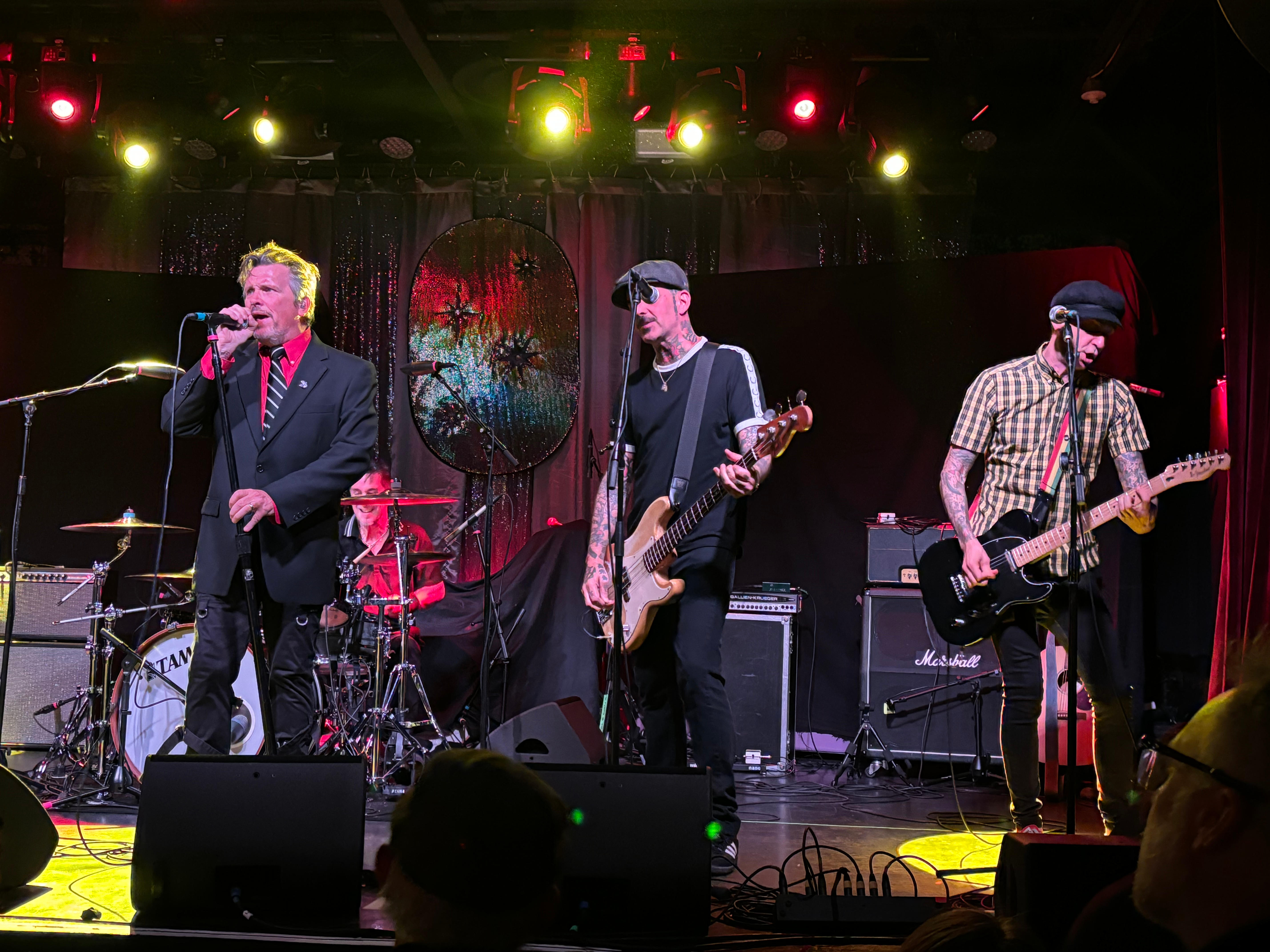
- The Defiant performs at the Asbury Lanes in Asbury Park, NJ on April 27, 2024

Background information
- Origin: USA
- Genres: Punk rock; pop-punk; alternative rock; pop
- Years active: 2023–present
- Label: Cranberry Bog
- Members: Dicky Barrett; Pete Parada; Greg Camp; Johnny Rioux; Joey La Rocca
- Website: www.thedefiantofficial.com

The Defiant is an American punk rock supergroup consisting of vocalist Dicky Barrett (the Mighty Mighty BossToneS), drummer Pete Parada (the Offspring), guitarist Greg Camp (Smash Mouth), bassist Johnny Rioux (Street Dogs), and guitarist Joey La Rocca (the Briggs).

== History ==
=== Band formation ===
The band began as the result of writing sessions between Barrett, Camp and Parada during the COVID-19 pandemic lockdown, following Parada's controversial departure from the Offspring in 2021 due to his refusal to be vaccinated against COVID-19; and Barrett's breakup with the Mighty Mighty Bosstones in part due to his opposition to the COVID-19 vaccine mandates.

=== Debut album ===
The band released their debut album, If We're Really Being Honest, on October 27, 2023, through Cranberry Bog Records, followed by a string of promotional appearances on Timcast IRL and other television and internet programs. Following the release, the band announced a major US tour supporting Me First and the Gimme Gimmes in early 2024. The band performed their single "Dead Language" on Jimmy Kimmel Live! on April 3, 2024.

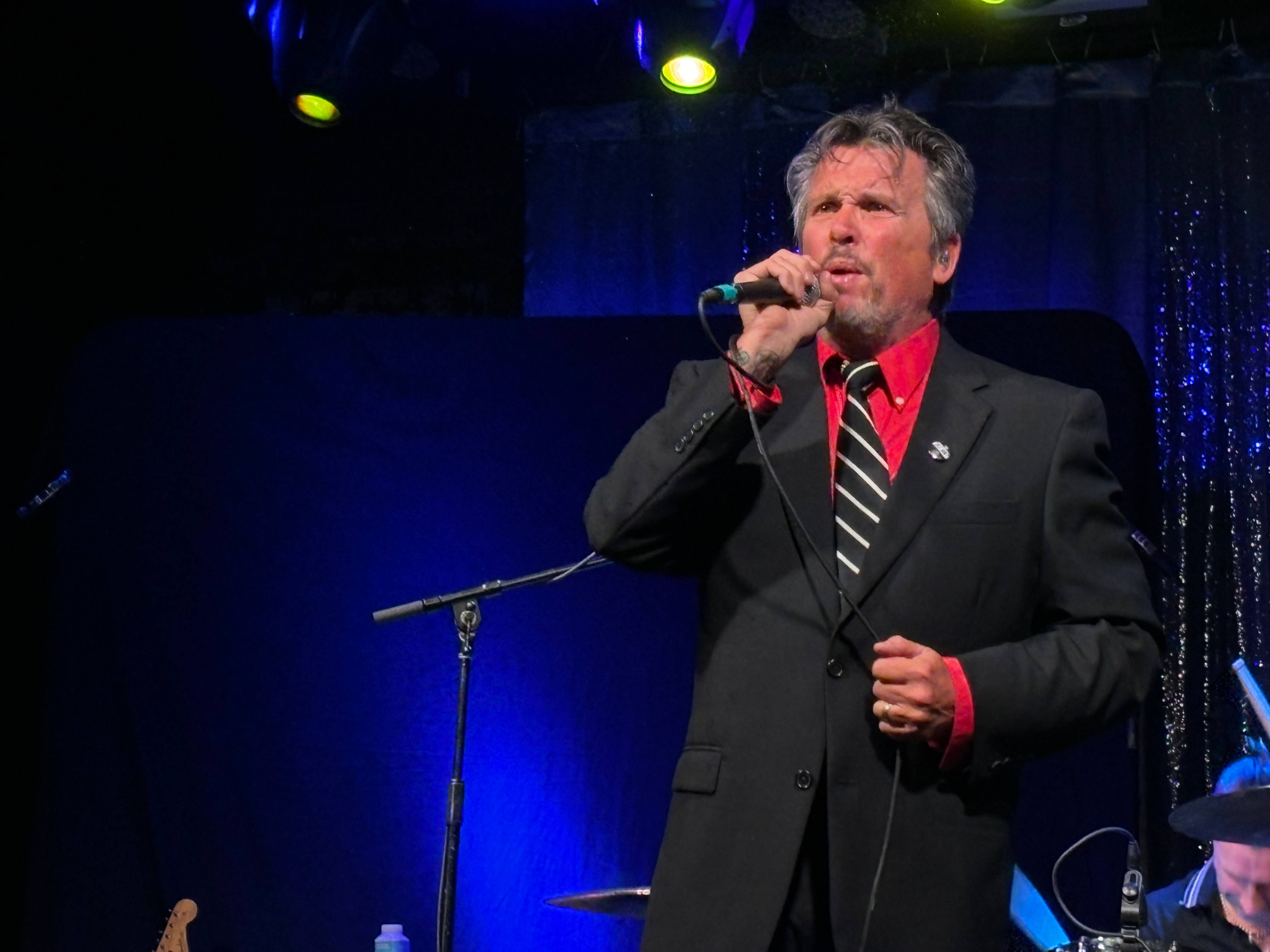
Dicky Barrett performs with The Defiant at the Asbury Lanes in Asbury Park, NJ on April 27, 2024.

== Discography ==
=== Albums ===
- If We're Really Being Honest (2023)

=== Singles ===
- "Where Did Lady Liberty Go?" (feat. Al Barr)
- "Dead Language"
- "Can't Stop Crying"
- "Everybody Loves Me"
- "Where Were You?"

== Band members ==
- Dicky Barrett - vocals (2023–present)
- Greg Camp - guitar (2023–present)
- Pete Parada - drums (2023–present)
- Johnny Rioux - bass guitar (2023–present)
- Joey La Rocca - guitar (2023–present)
