= The Impression That I Get =

1997 single by the Mighty Mighty Bosstones

Single by the Mighty Mighty Bosstones

from the album Let's Face It
- Released: February 10, 1997
- Genre: Ska punk; alternative rock; punk rock; reggae rock
- Length: 3:14
- Label: Big Rig; Mercury
- Songwriters: Dicky Barrett; Joe Gittleman
- Producers: Paul Q. Kolderie; Sean Slade

The Mighty Mighty Bosstones singles chronology
"Hell of a Hat" (1995)	"The Impression That I Get" (1997)	"The Rascal King" (1997)

"The Impression That I Get" is a song by American ska punk band the Mighty Mighty Bosstones, released as the lead single from their fifth studio album, Let's Face It (1997), in February 1997. The track reached number one on the US Billboard Modern Rock Tracks chart and number 23 on the Billboard Hot 100 Airplay chart while also charting highly in Australia, Canada, and the United Kingdom. The song was certified gold in the United States and Australia. Chris Applebaum directed the song's music video while Adam Stern produced it.

== Background ==
More than a year before the release of Let's Face It, the song appeared on Safe and Sound: A Benefit in Response to the Brookline Clinic Violence; the album was released in response to the slayings of two abortion clinic workers in two different clinics in Brookline, Massachusetts on December 30, 1994.

== Music ==
Musically, the song is a mix of ska punk, alternative rock, punk rock, and reggae rock.

== Live performances ==
On October 25, 1997, the Mighty Mighty Bosstones performed this song during their debut performance on a season 23 episode of Saturday Night Live hosted by Chris Farley.

In 1998, a live version of this song appeared on Live from the Middle East.

== Track listings ==
- US 7-inch single
1. "The Impression That I Get" – 3:15
2. "At It Again" – 2:04
- UK CD 1 and cassette single
1. "The Impression That I Get" – 3:15
2. "Is It 2" – 2:53
- UK CD 2
1. "The Impression That I Get" – 3:15
2. "Wake Up Call" – 2:16
3. "So Many Ways" – 2:38
- European CD single
1. "The Impression That I Get" – 3:15
2. "Desensitized" – 2:04
3. "Is It" – 2:53
4. "Storm Hit" – 3:15
- Australian CD single
1. "The Impression That I Get" – 3:13
2. "Is It?" – 2:53
3. "Storm Hit" – 3:14

== Charts ==
=== Weekly charts ===
Chart (1997–1998)	Peak position
Australia (ARIA)	11
Canada Top Singles (RPM)	26
Canada Adult Contemporary (RPM)	33
Canada Rock/Alternative (RPM)	1
Scottish Singles Sales (Official Charts)	10
UK Singles (Official Charts)	12
US Hot 100 Airplay (Billboard)	23
US Adult Top 40 (Billboard)	17
US Modern Rock Tracks (Billboard)	1
US Top 40/Mainstream (Billboard)	19

=== Year-end charts ===
Chart (1997)	Position
Canada Rock/Alternative (RPM)	7
US Hot 100 Airplay (Billboard)	46
US Modern Rock Tracks (Billboard)	3
US Top 40/Mainstream (Billboard)	61

Chart (1998)	Position
Australia (ARIA)	54

== Certifications ==
Region	Certification	Certified units/sales
Australia (ARIA)	Gold	35,000^{^}
New Zealand (RMNZ)	Gold	15,000^{‡}
United Kingdom (BPI)	Silver	200,000^{‡}
United States (RIAA)	Gold	500,000^{‡}
^{^} Shipments figures based on certification alone.^{‡} Sales+streaming figures based on certification alone.

== Release history ==
Region	Date	Format(s)	Label(s)	Ref(s).
United States	February 10, 1997	Rock radio	Big Rig; Mercury	
United States	May 6, 1997	Contemporary hit radio	Big Rig; Mercury	
United Kingdom	April 13, 1998	CD	Big Rig; Mercury	

== Usage in media ==
The song is featured on the soundtrack to the films Step Brothers, Chasing Amy, Fathers' Day, Krippendorf's Tribe, and Digimon: The Movie. The song is featured as a playable track in the North American and European versions of the 2003 video game Donkey Konga, as well as the 2009 video game Band Hero and the 2015 video game Rock Band 4. It is often credited as the origin of the Disney Channel theme, but the jingle was actually composed by Alex Lasarenko. Likewise, there is no official tie between this song and the 1997 rearrangement of the theme from America's Funniest Home Videos, which was assembled by Dan Slider, based on his own previous theme.

== See also ==
- List of Billboard number-one alternative singles of the 1990s
- List of RPM Rock/Alternative number-one singles
