= Bim Skala Bim =

American ska band

- Origin: Boston, Massachusetts, United States
- Genres: Third wave ska Ska punk
- Years active: 1983–2002; 2009–present
- Members: Dan Vitale; Mark Ferranti; Jim Arhelger; Vinny Nobile; Jim Jones; Dave Butts
- Past members: John Cameron; Ephraim Lessell; Rick Barry; Robin Ducot; Mark Paquin; Jackie Starr; Lauren Flesher; John Ferry; Chris Rhodes; Walt Bostian

Bim Skala Bim is a ska band formed in Boston that was influenced by the bands in England's two-tone movement, as well as artists such as the Clash, UB40 and Bob Marley. Their "Boston Blue Beat" sound, a mix of upbeat two-tone ska, rock 'n' roll, and calypso, made them, along with The Toasters, some of the first bands in the third wave of ska in the 1980s.

== History ==
In 1986, the band's self-titled debut album was featured on the cover of CMJ.

In 1997, Bim Skala Bim, the Dropkick Murphys, and the Mighty Bosstones embarked on a 50-date nationwide "Boston on the Road" tour.

Since their formation in 1983, Bim Skala Bim has released twelve LPs, won ten Boston Music Awards, eight Boston Phoenix Reader's Poll awards, and Boston magazine's "Best of Boston" twice.

In March 2013, Boston Business Journal rated Bim Skala Bim's album Bones #19 in their "Boston Top 40 Albums of All Time" list.

Bim Skala Bim went on hiatus in 2002, but they reformed to record a new album titled Chet's Last Call, released in late 2013.

The song "Paraguayan Sun" is the outro music for the tabletop gaming podcast Cast Dice.

== Band members ==
=== Current ===
- Dan Vitale (vocals)
- Mark Ferranti (bass)
- Jim Jones (guitar, vocals, 1985–present)
- Jim Arhelger (drums, 1985–present)
- Vinny Nobile (trombone, keyboards, 1986–96, 2000–present)
- Rick Barry (percussion, 1986–1995, 2010–present))

=== Former ===
- John Ferry (trombone, vocals, 1983–86, 1998–99)
- Chris Kramtch (drums, 1983)
- Ephraim Lessell (guitar, 1983)
- Robin Ducot (keyboards, 1983–84)
- John Sullivan (drums, 1983–84)
- Will Cluster (guitar, 1983–84)
- Lauren Flesher (vocals, 1984–85)
- John Cameron (keyboard, saxophone, 1985–99)
- Jackie Starr (vocals, keyboards, 1985–89)
- Rick Barry (percussion, 1986–96)
- Mark Paquin (trombone, 1996–98)
- Chris Rhodes (trombone, 2000)
- Dave Butts (horns, keyboards)

== Discography ==
=== Studio albums ===
- Bim Skala Bim (1986)
- Tuba City (1989)
- How's It Goin'? (1990)
- Bones (1991)
- Eyes & Ears (1995)
- American Playhouse (1995)
- Universal (1997)
- The One That Got Away (1998)
- Krinkle (2000)
- Chet's Last Call (2013)
- Musical Biscuits (2013; digital release only)
- Sonic Tonic (2021)

=== Singles and EPs ===
- Fat Head (1987)
- Bim Skala Bim / Stabilizer (3) (1991)
- Concert-Freebie: Marquee; Friday 14th July 1995 (1995)
- Skeleton (1995)
- Capone and the Bullets / Bim Skala Bim - Godfather/Sunshine (1996)
- Test Patterns (1999)
- King Hammond, Bim Skala Bim - Mad Not Cancer (2014)

=== Live albums ===
- Live at the Paradise (1993)

=== Compilation appearances ===
- Boston Does the Beatles (1988)
- Mashin' Up the Nation: Best of U.S. Ska Vol. 1 (1988)
- Skankin' Round the World, Vol. 1 (1989)
- Place of General Happiness (1993)
- The Shack (1994)
- We Don't Skare (1994)
- Mashin' Up the Nation: The Best of American Ska, Vols. 1&2 (1991)
- Ska: Cover to Cover (1996)
- Joint Ventures in Ska (1996)
- Mash It Up, Vol. 3 (1996)
- SKAndalous: I've Gotcha Covered (1996)
- Mash It Up, Vol. 4 (1997)
- Ska Down Her Way (1997)
- The Ska Parade: Runnin' Naked Thru the Cornfield (1998)
- Big Indie Beats (1998)
- Love and Affection: Ska in the Key of Love (1998)
- Mashin' Up the Nation: The Best of American Ska Vols. 3 & 4 (1998)
- Steady Sounds from the Underground (1998)
- Boston, Vol. 2 (1999)
- Ska Party '99 (1999)
- Club Ska '99: The Shack Vol. 2 (1999)
- Welcome to Beatville (1999)
- Mash It Up 2000: It's Alive Boston: Ska Vol. 5 (2000)
- Still Standing – A North American Ska Uprising (2003)

== Awards ==
- 10 Boston Music Awards
- 8 Boston Phoenix Reader's Poll Awards
- Boston Magazine's Best of Boston twice
- Boston Business Journal - Bim Skala Bim Bones Album, #19 of Boston Top 40 Albums of All Time
- Top Ten Local Shows for 2014 - Bim Skala Bim at The Middle East Cambridge MA (August 2014)
- Reggae Steady Ska - Best of 2014 - Best Live Band #2 Bim Skala Bim
- Reggae Steady Ska - Best of 2014 - 7" Vinyl of the Year #1 Various: Bim Skala Bim, King Hammond (taken from Specialized 3 - Mad Not Cancer)
- Bim Skala Bim Chet's Last Call debuted on National Jamband.com radio chart at No. 25 (Marcy 2014)
