= The Mighty Mighty Bosstones =

American ska punk band

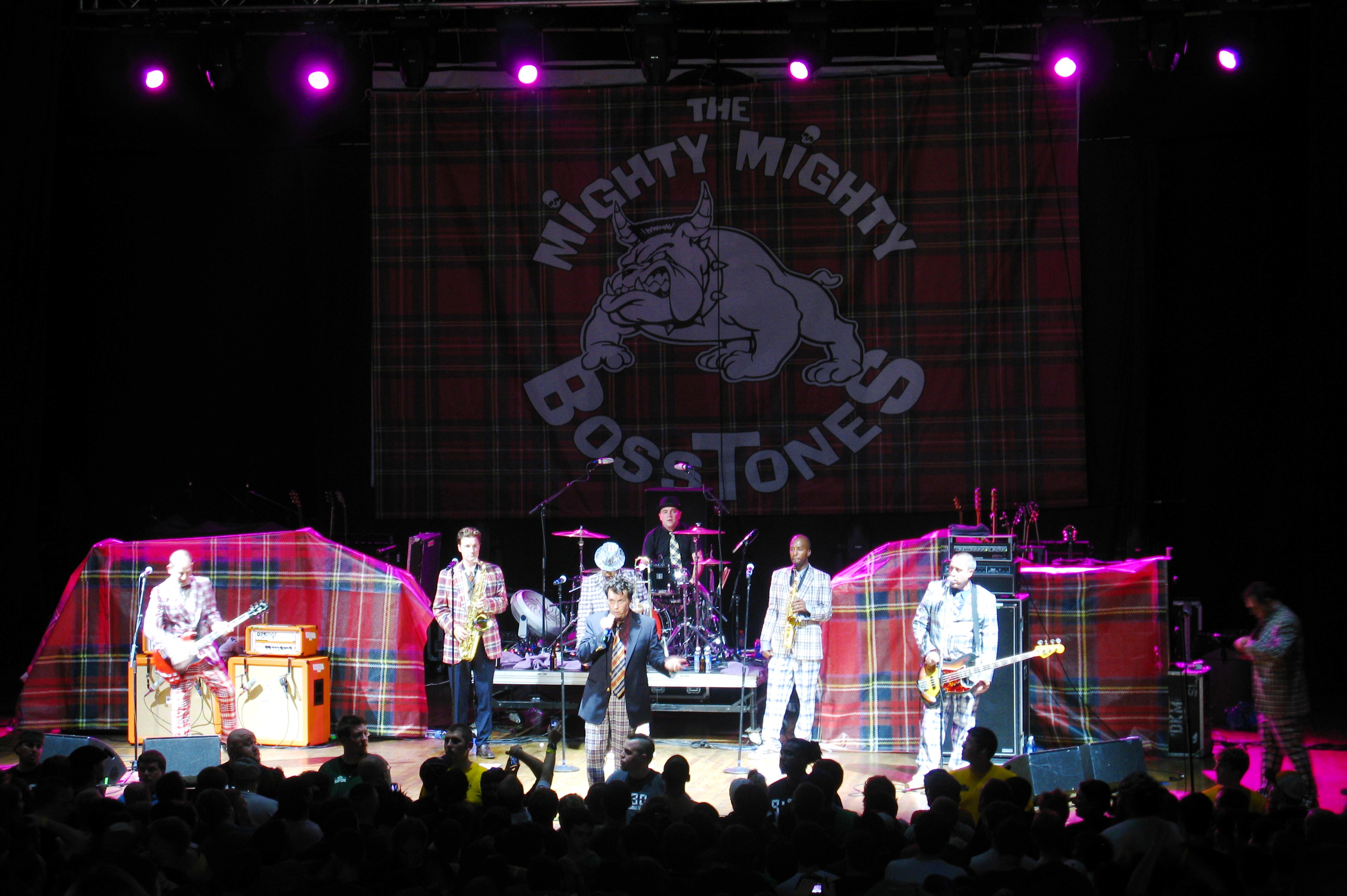
- The Mighty Mighty Bosstones performing in 2008

Background information
- Also known as: The Bosstones
- Origin: Boston, Massachusetts, U.S.
- Genres: Ska punk; ska; hardcore punk; punk rock
- Works: Discography
- Years active: 1983–2003; 2007–2022; 2026–present
- Labels: Taang!; Mercury; Big Rig; Island Def Jam; SideOneDummy; Hellcat
- Members: Dicky Barrett
- Past members: Tim Burton; Ben Carr; Joe Gittleman; John Goetchius; Lawrence Katz; Chris Rhodes; Leon Silva; Joe Sirois; Nate Albert; Tim Bridwell; Dennis Brockenborough; Josh Dalsimer; Roman Fleysher; Kevin Lenear
- Website: www.bosstonesmusic.com

The Mighty Mighty Bosstones (informally referred to as The Bosstones and often stylized as The Mighty Mighty BossToneS) are an American ska punk band from Boston, Massachusetts, formed in 1983. From the band's inception, lead vocalist Dicky Barrett, bassist Joe Gittleman, tenor saxophonist Tim "Johnny Vegas" Burton and dancer ("Bosstone") Ben Carr remained constant members. The band's final lineup also included drummer Joe Sirois, saxophonist Leon Silva, guitarist Lawrence Katz, keyboardist John Goetchius, and trombonist Chris Rhodes.

The Bosstones are often credited as one of the progenitors of the genre of ska punk and the creators of its subgenre ska-core, which mixes elements of ska with hardcore punk. Starting with the release of their 1989 debut Devil's Night Out, the band toured and recorded extensively throughout the 1990s, becoming influential in the development of the American third-wave ska scene and was one of the first bands to popularize the genre in the musical mainstream. They reached their commercial peak with their platinum-selling 1997 album Let's Face It and its hit single "The Impression That I Get". The band was also notable for being featured in the 1995 film Clueless as the frat party house band. The band had released seven studio albums, three EPs and a live album by the time they announced a hiatus in December 2003. In 2007, the Bosstones reunited to resume recording and touring, and released four more studio albums between 2009 and 2021. From 1994 to 2002, and again from 2007 to 2019, they hosted the annual Hometown Throwdown music festival, held annually around Christmas time in Cambridge and later Boston. The band disbanded in 2022, with Barrett reviving it in 2026.

== History ==
=== Early history (1983–1988) ===
The band's roots lie in the hardcore punk scene of the early 1980s, along with a strong influence from the British 2 Tone ska scene of the 1970s. Bassist Joe Gittleman played with local hardcore band Gang Green, while vocalist Dicky Barrett was a member of Impact Unit and, later on, Cheapskates. The Cheapskates lineup went through frequent changes and would feature members of Gang Green on occasion. It was through Cheapskates that a core lineup coalesced around Barrett, Gittleman, Tim "Johnny Vegas" Burton (saxophone), Nate Albert (guitar), Josh Dalsimer (drums), Tim Bridwell (trumpet) and Ben Carr (a dancing non-musician often credited as "Bosstone"). The group decided on the name, "the Bosstones" as a reference to the city near their hometowns. While some of the band members were influenced by bands such as AC/DC, Social Distortion, Motörhead, The Clash and Stiff Little Fingers, Barrett had become enthralled with 2 Tone ska, which was in the tail end of its prominence.

In 1987, the Bosstones made their recorded debut when they were featured on the Mash It Up ska compilation. The Bosstones' contribution was "The Cave", and "Ugly". Another early recording, "Drums and Chickens," appeared on the 1989 ska compilation Mashin' Up The Nation. By the time Mashin' Up The Nation was released, the Bosstones had temporarily disbanded in order for Albert and Gittleman to finish high school. After their graduation, the band reunited. Around this time, it was brought to the band's attention that an a cappella group, The Bosstones, had already used the name during the 1950s. A bartender friend arbitrarily suggested that they become the "Mighty Mighty Bosstones", in order to avoid any possible legal hassles, to which the band agreed.

=== Taang! years (1989–1992) ===
Despite not consistently drawing large crowds at their live shows, the Taang! record label gave the band a recording contract which would result in the Devil's Night Out album, produced by Paul Q. Kolderie. The album was released to positive local and lukewarm national reaction during a time when ska was struggling to move out of the American underground. The band found resistance from ska purists who did not like that the band were not playing traditional ska while hardcore fans were against the ska and heavy metal elements in the music. Despite the initial reaction, Devil's Night Out has gone on to become one of the band's most popular albums.

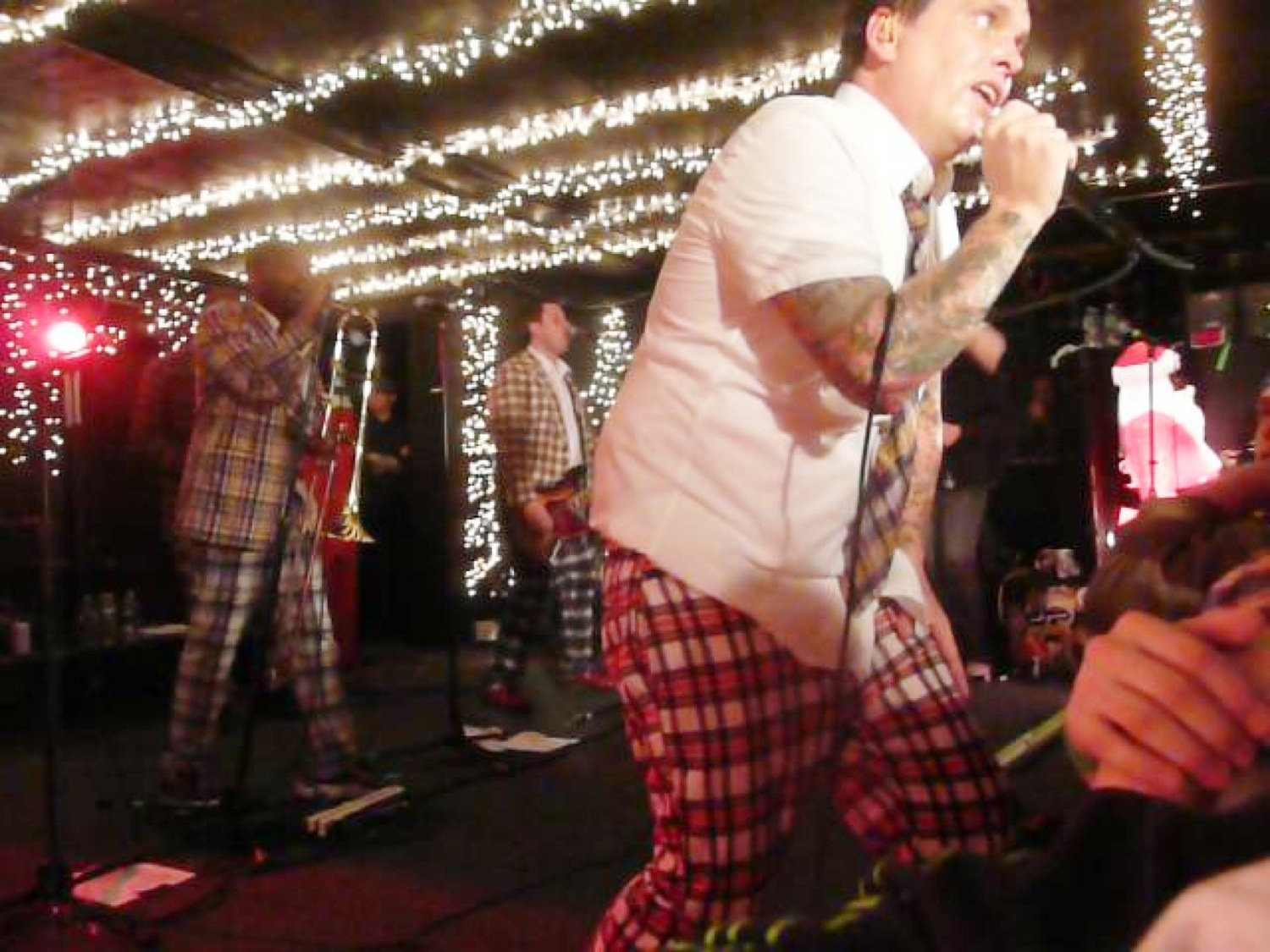
The Bosstones in 2008, wearing their trademark plaid clothes. Front: Dicky Barrett, Back, from left: Chris Rhodes, Lawrence Katz

It was during this time that the band's trademark plaid clothing came to be. After a show where Barrett wore plaid, fans started to show up wearing it as well. It was noticeable enough that the band was approached by the Converse sneaker company to promote Chuck Taylor sneakers. The band accepted the proposal and were seen in one print ad and several television commercials promoting the sneakers.

By this time, Tim Bridewell had left the band, to be replaced by Dennis Brockenborough (trombone) and Kevin Lenear (saxophone). The band's next release was an EP titled Where'd You Go?. The EP featured the title track as well as cover versions of Aerosmith's "Sweet Emotion", Metallica's "Enter Sandman", Van Halen's "Ain't Talkin' 'bout Love" and a new version of "Do Somethin' Crazy", originally featured on Devil's Night Out.

In 1991, the band set out on their first full American tour. It was during the first leg of touring that drummer Josh Dalsimer would leave the band to pursue a college education. He would be replaced by Joe Sirois, who Barrett met at Bunker Hill Community College. Sirois would immediately join his new bandmates in the recording studio to start work on the band's second album.

Once again produced by Paul Q. Kolderie, More Noise and Other Disturbances was released in June 1992. The band would film a video for the song "Where'd You Go?" which had previously been available on the EP of the same name (though the band had also recorded a video for "Guns and the Young"), the video was not finished until a few years after it was recorded.

During this era, the band published a newsletter for their fans titled 737.

=== Mainstream success and Big Rig Records (1993–2001) ===
The band signed to their first major label when they joined the Mercury Records roster and soon recorded the Ska-Core, the Devil, and More EP. Released in March 1993, it was largely a collection of cover songs. Four of the seven tracks paid homage to the band's influences: The Angry Samoans' "Lights Out", Minor Threat's "Think Again", SSD's "Police Beat" and The Wailers' "Simmer Down". Three live tracks were included as well. The EP contained one new studio track "Someday I Suppose," which would later appear on the band's third full-length album.

Produced by Tony Platt, the band's third LP, Don't Know How to Party contained a cover of Stiff Little Fingers' song "Tin Soldiers" as well as a vocal appearance by Daryl Jennifer of Bad Brains. A video was also filmed for "Someday I Suppose" and it received minor airplay on MTV. Though the footage was originally intended to serve as a promo for the Bosstones debut on Mercury, the label liked the footage and turned it into a single. The band would also appear on the 1994 Kiss My Ass tribute to Kiss album, covering "Detroit Rock City". Mercury Records released it as a single, appearing on 7-inch green vinyl and backed by the original Kiss version of the song. Soon after, the band found themselves invited by fellow Bostonian Steven Tyler, to open up for Aerosmith at their New Year's Eve concert in Boston. While it was not the most successful show the Bosstones had played, it ensured that the Bosstones started 1994 on the road as they had intended.

The band released their fourth album, Question the Answers, in October 1994. The album featured production work by the Butcher Bros., Paul Q. Kolderie and Ross Humphrey. It was at this time that the band decided it wanted to release their albums on vinyl, leading to a partnership with Mercury Records to form Big Rig Records, a vanity label that allowed the band to release their albums on vinyl. The Big Rig vinyl versions often contained a bonus track not seen on the cassette or CD versions. Besides touring, the band found itself making their network television debut on The Jon Stewart Show and hosting MTV's 120 Minutes. They also contributed a new version of "Where'd You Go?" to the Alicia Silverstone movie Clueless. The band also made an appearance in the film, performing the songs "Where'd You Go?" and "Someday I Suppose" during a college fraternity party scene. On top of their TV and film appearances, the band was added to the main stage of the 1995 Lollapalooza tour. Mercury set about repromoting Question the Answers by adding a second disc with five B-side tracks. The EP was titled Here We Go Again and it was compiled by Barrett at the request of Mercury.

After touring as part of the 1996 Warped Tour lineup (which they would repeat the following year), the Bosstones began work on their next studio album. Released in 1997, Let's Face It, would prove to be the band's biggest seller, mostly due to its first single "The Impression That I Get", which reached number one on the Billboard Modern Rock Tracks chart. The album was followed by Video Stew, a VHS compilation of the band's twelve music videos. The mainstream exposure led to the band's appearance on Sesame Street's Elmopalooza television special and Grammy Award-winning soundtrack album, in which they performed the song "The Zig Zag Dance" with The Count. The band also made their Saturday Night Live debut, performing "The Impression That I Get".

Capitalizing on the band's popularity, Mercury released the band's live album, Live From the Middle East in October 1998. The album was recorded live in Cambridge, Massachusetts at The Middle East Restaurant and Nightclub during the band's annual end-of-the-year Hometown Throwdown from 1997. In 1999, the band contributed their cover version of the song "Rudie Can't Fail" to Burning London, the Clash tribute compilation. Shortly after all of these releases, Kevin Lenear quit the band to work on his own material and was replaced by Roman Fleysher.

In 2000, the band released Pay Attention which failed to meet expectations set by the previous album. "So Sad to Say", was released as a single, but it never reached a position higher than No. 22 on the Billboard charts. Ultimately, the album did not sell as well as their previous release. This was to be the band's last album with Mercury Records, who along with PolyGram, had become part of the Universal Music Group who subsequently merged Island Records and Def Jam Recordings forming the new Island Def Jam label. The band, unhappy with the way the newly formed label had been handling them, asked for a release from their contract, to which the label agreed. After the recording of Pay Attention, founding member Nate Albert left in order to obtain a degree in political theory from Brown University. His next musical venture would be as a member of Evan Dando’s re-formed Lemonheads before forming The Kickovers, which focused more on a 1970's punk sound than ska. Albert eventually became involved in band management, handling bands such as Bayside and Lost City Angels. Albert's replacement on guitar was Lawrence Katz who appeared in the band photo on the album's reverse and in the music video for "So Sad to Say". Pay Attention was also the last album for Dennis Brockenborough who had already formed his own band, Chubby, for which he sang and played guitar. Brockenborough's replacement was former Spring Heeled Jack member Chris Rhodes. Spring Heeled Jack had dissolved in 2000, and Rhodes had recently taken a vacant trombone position with Bim Skala Bim when he received the invitation to join.

=== SideOneDummy and hiatus (2002–2006) ===
The band announced their return to an independent label when they signed with SideOneDummy Records. In July 2002, the band released A Jackknife to a Swan and from it the song "You Gotta Go!" was released as a single and video. The band continued to tour but in December 2003, they announced their decision to go on a hiatus and were forced to forgo that year's Hometown Throwdown. One contributing factor was that several band members were reported to already be busy with other bands and side projects. Another factor was that the band had been touring, almost non-stop, since 1991, and some of the band members desired a break.

After the hiatus announcement, several members went on to work on other projects and bands. Barrett became the announcer on ABC's Jimmy Kimmel Live! late night talk show. In 2005, he became the host of the Mighty Morning Show on Los Angeles radio's Indie 103.1 FM. In March 2006, he was dismissed from the radio station.

Before the hiatus announcement, Gittleman had already formed a side project band named Avoid One Thing featuring members of Darkbuster, the Raging Teens and Spring Heeled Jack. The band released two albums for SideOneDummy before announcing their own hiatus in 2005.

Sirois recorded and toured with Nate Albert's next band, Kickovers, and also played drums for the Street Dogs and Frank Black.

Rhodes went on to play with The Toasters until his departure in 2006. Rhodes had just joined Bim Skala Bim before the Bosstones' hiatus came to an end and left Bim Skala Bim as a result. He also performed with former Spring Heeled Jack bandmate Rick Omonte in The Mountain Movers and as a fill-in trombonist for Less Than Jake, Reel Big Fish, and NOFX.

Fleysher continued his pursuit of a professional pilot's license. In 2005, after taking classes near his home in South Florida and working as a flight instructor in his spare time, he was hired as an airline pilot for CommutAir, a Continental Airlines regional affiliate based in Plattsburgh, New York. After a short stint with the company, he began flying as a charter pilot in Los Angeles, California.

Burton and his family moved to Los Angeles where he became active in the movie business. Besides working for a Hollywood agent, he wrote several scripts and developed projects for television. He also contributed saxophone for a Cypress Hill song. In 2007, he appeared in the film Crazy, which was inspired by the life of Hank Garland.

Katz formed a band named Resistant. Katz has also played guitar on several motion picture soundtracks including Aquamarine, The Good Night and London, the latter recorded in collaboration with The Crystal Method.

=== End of hiatus and breakup (2007–2022) ===
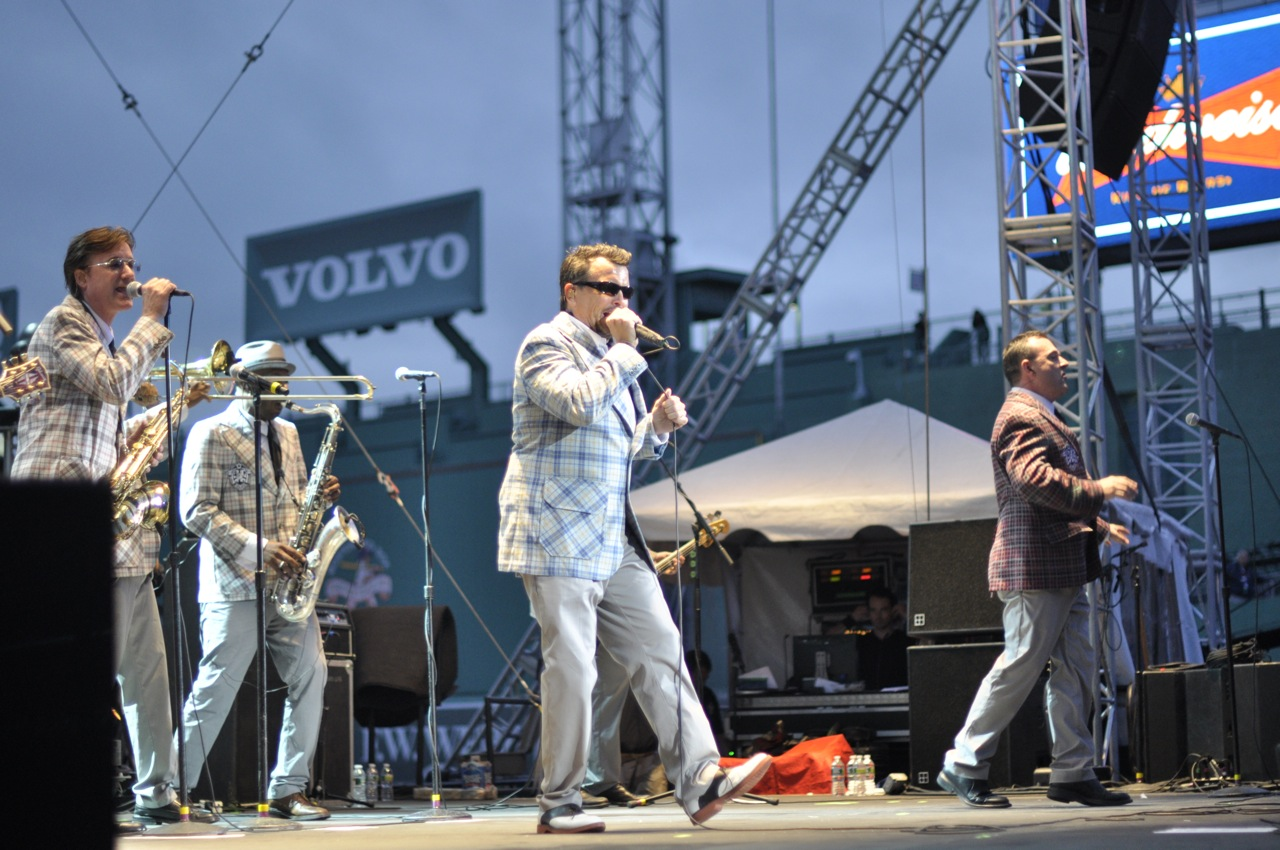
The Bosstones playing Fenway Park in 2011. L-R: Tim "Johnny Vegas" Burton, Kevin Lenear, Dicky Barrett, Ben "The Bosstone" Carr

Because the band left the possibility of playing together again open, rumors and speculation frequently circulated that a reunion was inevitable. The hiatus of Joe Gittleman's band, Avoid One Thing, fueled further speculation of such a reunion.

During an Alternative Press Acoustic Session, members of fellow Boston area ska band Big D and the Kids Table hinted that the Bosstones were in fact reuniting for another Hometown Throwdown. Jerry Mattes, the creator of the band's bulldog mascot, also acknowledged the chances of a reunion and announced that he was designing a new logo for the band.

On October 11, 2007, on Boston Radio Station WBCN, Dicky Barrett confirmed what he called "the worst kept secret in Boston": the announcement that the Bosstones would indeed play a tenth official Hometown Throwdown at Cambridge's famed Middle East club on December 26–30, 2007. Barrett would not confirm any long-term plans for the band. Soon after Barrett's announcement, Gittleman declared that the band intended to record three new songs to be included on an upcoming collection of unreleased material and vinyl B-sides. The album, titled Medium Rare, was released on December 18, 2007. The three new songs marked the first new material recorded since the 2002 release of A Jackknife to a Swan.

After the 2007 Throwdown, the Bosstones played a few shows every couple of months. At two of the March shows in Las Vegas and Los Angeles, Jimmy Kimmel served as a guest star on bass clarinet during "The Impression That I Get". Former saxophonist Lenear rejoined the band, replacing Fleysher, whose job prevented him from being able to play with the band. Despite the activity, the Bosstones remained non-committal on whether they would record and release a studio album. They did make it known that they would no longer tour at the frequency they were known for in the past.

On May 15, 2008, it was reported that the Bosstones would be embarking on a short United States tour in July with the Dropkick Murphys. During the tour, the Bosstones made three stops at Boston Red Sox minor league ballparks. On October 20, 2008, their website announced that they would return to the Middle East in Cambridge to play an eleventh Hometown Throwdown on December 26–29. In late 2008, the game Rock Band 2 was released and featured a re-recorded version of "Where'd You Go?" that the band had recorded earlier in the year. On November 4, 2008, a MySpace blog announced the recording of a new album, and streamed two new songs, "The Impossible Dream" and "Next to Nothing". On July 29, 2009, the band announced the completion of tracking for the album. On October 16, 2009, the album title was announced to be Pin Points and Gin Joints and a free download of the song "Graffiti Worth Reading" was made available. The release date was later stated as December 8, 2009.

The band continued to tour through the summer of 2009 with shows in Buffalo, New York, Providence, Rhode Island, Asbury Park, New Jersey, Seattle, Washington, San Francisco, California, Anaheim, California, Hampton Beach, New Hampshire, and Victoria, British Columbia where they performed at the Victoria Ska Fest with Voodoo Glow Skulls, The Slackers and Chris Murray. The band toured during the summer of 2010 with Teenage Bottlerocket and the Flatliners. They also hosted their annual Hometown Throwdown festival over three nights in December 2010.

In August 2011, Chris Rhodes posted a Facebook update stating that The Mighty Mighty Bosstones had begun work on their next album. The album, titled The Magic of Youth, was released on December 6, 2011.

March 2017 saw the release of their first recording in six years with a limited edition vinyl 7" featuring a cover version of the Burt Bacharach song, "What the World Needs Now Is Love" backed with the track "I Won’t Go Out Like That". In the time between releases, the lineup saw the addition of former Cherry Poppin' Daddies keyboard player, John Goetchius in 2008 and Leon Silva in 2016 to replace Kevin Lenear who had departed the band for a second time earlier that same year.

In September 2017, Tim Burton announced in a post Riot Fest interview that the band was working on a new album set for release in early 2018. According to guitarist Lawrence Katz and producer Ted Hutt's Instagram accounts, recording started on Friday, November 17 at Kingsize Soundlabs in Los Angeles, California. The new album's title was announced to be While We're at It.

While We're at It, the band's tenth album, was released on June 15, 2018. It is the final part of a musical trilogy that began with Pin Points and Gin Joints in 2009 followed by The Magic of Youth in 2011. For the initial 2018 tour dates supporting the album, Silva could not participate due to his commitments performing with Justin Timberlake. To temporarily fill in for Silva, the band brought in Roman Fleysher and Peter "JR" Wasilewski of Less Than Jake to play saxophone on select dates.

On January 25, 2021, it was announced that the Mighty Mighty Bosstones had signed a new record contract with Hellcat Records. In conjunction with the announcement, the band released a new single titled, "The Final Parade" which features guest appearances by Jamaican singer Stranger Cole and members of Rancid, The Interrupters, Fishbone, Stiff Little Fingers, The Suicide Machines, Less Than Jake, Murphy's Law, H_{2}O, Goldfinger, Sonic Boom Six, The Toasters, Bim Skala Bim, Big D and the Kids Table, Doped Up Dollies, The Aggrolites, Dance Hall Crashers, The Aquabats, Buck-O-Nine, The Porkers, The Pietasters, Los Skanarles, Buster Shuffle, Kemuri, Big Bad Voodoo Daddy, and The Specials.

In March 2021, the band announced their first album since signing to Hellcat Records, When God Was Great, would be released on May 7, 2021, and released the album's second single "I Don't Believe in Anything". The album's third single, "The Killing of King Georgie (Part III)", a song about the murder of George Floyd, was released on April 21, 2021.

On January 27, 2022, the band announced that they had split up. The statement shared by the band reads: "After decades of brotherhood, touring the world and making great records together we have decided not to continue on as a band. Above all, we want to express our sincere gratitude to every single one of you who have supported us. We could not have done any of it without you. Love Always, The Mighty Mighty BossToneS." Although the band chose to keep their reasoning for the split private, speculation suggested that it was over Barrett's stance on COVID-19 vaccines and his participation in the production of a video promoting the "Defeat the Mandates" anti-vaccination mandate rally held by Robert F. Kennedy Jr. In February 2022, Barrett was a guest on The Highwire with Del Bigtree podcast where he confirmed that it was his anti-vaccination views that had made the rest of the band uncomfortable.

=== Post-breakup and revival (2022–present) ===
Since the split, the members have pursued other careers or moved forward with new bands with Barrett forming The Defiant, Gittleman forming the Kilograms with Sammy Kay and Jeff Rickels, and Rhodes returning to Spring Heeled Jack while also performing shows with the Skatalites and the Toasters.

In December 2025, Barrett stated that he was working on reuniting the Mighty Mighty Bosstones. On November 13, 2026, the Mighty Mighty Bosstones were announced as performers at the Hollywood Bowl on May 8, 2027, alongside Madness, Dance Hall Crashers, Goldfinger, and Reel Big Fish, in what fans initially expected was a reunion. It was subsequently reported that the performance would feature vocalist Dicky Barrett alongside an entirely new backing band, rather than a reunion of the group’s longtime members. According to Gittleman's Kilograms bandmate, Sammy Kay, Gittleman, Sirois, Burton, Albert, and Rhodes would not be participating. Ben Carr confirmed in the comments of Kay's post that he was also not participating. It was additionally reported that Barrett had filed a trademark application for the band name, which remained pending as of October 9, 2026. On November 17, 2026, Barrett issued a statement through his personal Instagram account, as well as the band's official account, addressing the negative reaction to the announced performance. Barrett explained that the band had been invited to perform by Madness, whom he described as longtime heroes of the Mighty Mighty Bosstones. He claimed that five longtime members had agreed to participate, while others had declined for various reasons. Barrett maintained that no former members were being excluded and that all were welcome to participate in the performance. He also characterized the planned appearance as a positive development and called for an end to the hostility surrounding the band's revival.

== Big Rig Records ==
Big Rig Records started as a vanity label in 1993 due to the band's desire to release their records on vinyl. While the band wanted to release their albums on vinyl, the label had ceased pressing albums in that format. A partnership between Mercury and the band resulted in the label continuing to handle the conventional CD and cassette versions of the albums while allowing the band's Big Rig label to focus on the vinyl editions. The new label immediately issued re-releases of Don't Know How to Party and Ska-Core, the Devil, and More on colored vinyl.

Besides the band's own albums, additional releases include the first CD release of Dicky Barrett's previous band Impact Unit, as well as Vow of Poverty by the Boston punk band Mung, and Half Hour of Power by Sum 41. Additionally, the label also released a benefit compilation featuring various artists titled Safe and Sound: A Benefit in Response to the Brookline Clinic Violence, as well as, You Decide: Warped Tour 2000 Sampler, a sampler of bands featured on the 2000 Vans Warped Tour. The first new release under this partnership was Question the Answers and it continued through Pay Attention, the band's final album with the Island Def Jam Music Group, the label formed after the merger of Mercury Records, Island Records, and Def Jam Recordings. After leaving Mercury, the vinyl release of A Jackknife to a Swan was handled directly by SideOneDummy, the band's label at the time. Since the band's return from hiatus, Big Rig has been run exclusively by the Mighty Mighty Bosstones as their own independent record label, handling all of their new releases up until 2021's When God Was Great, which was released on Hellcat Records.

== Musical style ==
The band has been typically aligned with ska punk. The L.A. Times, described their sound as "blending the brassy after-beat groove of ska with the uncompromising intensity of hard-core punk". The Tampa Bay Times described it similarly as an "eclectic swirl of good-time music fuses the perky pick-it-up sound of pre-reggae ska with monstrous hard-core guitars." AllMusic credited them as being "one of the first bands to cross high-energy ska with hardcore punk and hard rock guitars", and "[laying] a great deal of the groundwork for the mid- to late-'90s ska explosion, helping shift its tone toward party music." The Boston Herald said that they "were one of the first bands to cross high-energy ska with hardcore punk and heavy metal.".

== Band members ==
=== Current lineup ===
- Dicky Barrett – lead vocals (1983–2003, 2007–2022, 2026–present)

=== Former members ===
- Tim "Johnny Vegas" Burton – tenor saxophone, backing vocals (1983–2003, 2007–2022)
- Ben Carr – dancer, backing vocals, percussion, tour manager and "Bosstone" (1983–2003, 2007–2022)
- Joe Gittleman – bass, backing vocals (1983–2003, 2007–2022)
- Joe Sirois – drums, percussion (1991–2003, 2007–2022)
- Lawrence Katz – guitar, backing vocals (2000–2003, 2007–2022)
- Chris Rhodes – trombone, backing vocals (2000–2003, 2007–2022)
- John Goetchius – keyboards (2008–2022)
- Leon Silva – tenor saxophone, backing vocals (2016–2022)
- Tim Bridwell – trombone (1983–1991)
- Josh Dalsimer – drums (1983–1991)
- Dennis Brockenborough – trombone (1991–2000)
- Kevin Lenear – alto, tenor, and baritone saxophones (1991–1998; 2008–2016)
- Nate Albert – guitar, backing vocals (1983–2000, 2015 live only, 2020–2022 studio only)
- Roman Fleysher – tenor saxophone (1998–2003, 2007–2008; sporadic appearances 2018–2021)

=== Additional personnel ===
- Peter Wasilewski – saxophone (touring member)
- Davey Holmes – keyboards
- Brian Dwyer – trumpet
- Kevin P. Stevenson – guitar
- Dave Aaronoff – keyboards
- Sledge Burton – trumpet
- Jon Nash – guitar

== Discography ==
- Devil's Night Out (1989)
- More Noise and Other Disturbances (1992)
- Don't Know How to Party (1993)
- Question the Answers (1994)
- Let's Face It (1997)
- Pay Attention (2000)
- A Jackknife to a Swan (2002)
- Pin Points and Gin Joints (2009)
- The Magic of Youth (2011)
- While We're at It (2018)
- When God Was Great (2021)
