= Hometown Throwdown =

Annual music festival

Hometown Throwdown was an annual music festival held in Greater Boston, hosted by the Mighty Mighty Bosstones. The festival featured local Boston-area acts, focusing on ska, punk and hardcore bands. The festival was traditionally held in December, usually the week between Christmas and New Year's Eve at clubs around Boston. The first Throwdown was held in July 27–31, 1994 at The Middle East in Cambridge. Starting in 1995, the festival moved to December. It ran annually until 2002, when the Bosstones went on hiatus. Both the band, and their festival, returned to active status in 2007, and it had been held annually until the 22nd, being held December 27–29, 2019 at the House of Blues in Boston.

== Festivals ==
Festivals have been held annually from 1994 to 2002 and again from 2007-2019.

#	dates	location	acts
1	July 27–31, 1994	The Middle East	Mighty Mighty Bosstones Shootys Groove Black Train Jack Still Home Love Huskies The Goats Godpocket Mung Steady Earnest Mephiskapheles The Belle Isles
2	December 13–17, 1995	The Middle East	Mighty Mighty Bosstones Big Lick H_{2}O Deniros Buzzkill Beezwax Doc Hopper Stubborn Allstars The Hornets Spring Heeled Jack Mung The Amazing Royal Crowns
3	December 11–15, 1996	T.T. the Bear's Place; The Rathskeller; Mama Kin's (now House of Blues); The Middle East; Paradise Rock Club	Mighty Mighty Bosstones The Agents Orange 9mm Toboggan The Scofflaws The Outlets Skinnerbox Betty Goo Murphy's Law The Racketeers The Pietasters The Shods
4	December 10–14, 1997	The Middle East	Mighty Mighty Bosstones Big D and the Kids Table Kicked in the Head The Allstonians The Mission 120 Clowns for Progress The Ducky Boys 9 Lives The Smooths Six Going on Seven Pressure Cooker Cast Iron Hike Johnny Too Bad and the Strikeouts Spinecracker
5	December 9–13, 1998	The Middle East	Mighty Mighty Bosstones The Spitvalves The Pietasters The Enkindels Mung Boxer The Ducky Boys Clowns for Progress Ann Beretta H_{2}O The Shods The Smooths Spring Heeled Jack
6	December 8–12, 1999	The Middle East	Mighty Mighty Bosstones Sam Black Church Reach the Sky Shades Apart Herself Edna's Goldfish The Gadjits The Raging Teens The Damn Personals The Radiation Kings Big Bad Bollocks Darkbuster Pilfers Drexel
7	December 6–10, 2000	Axis (now House of Blues)	Mighty Mighty Bosstones Venus 3 The Explosion Heidi The Interpreters The Kings of Nuthin' Slackers Jaya The Cat Sinners And Saints Flogging Molly Avail Dropkick Murphys
8	December 12–16, 2001	Axis (now House of Blues)	Mighty Mighty Bosstones Autopilot Off Rick Barton Madcap Jake Brennan & The Confidence Men Lost City Angels The Exit Catch 22 The Worried The Queers 5 Bucks! Sloppy Meat Eaters
9	December 11–15, 2002	Axis (now House of Blues)	Mighty Mighty Bosstones The Unseen Westbound Train The Street Dogs Favorite Atomic Hero Slick Shoes The Kenmores Suspect Device Avoid One Thing River City Rebels Damone
10	December 26–31, 2007	The Middle East; Lupo's Heartbreak Hotel	Mighty Mighty Bosstones Gaslight Anthem Bouncing Souls Darkbuster Westbound Train Street Dogs (two nights) Gimme Danger Shods Loved Ones Big D and the Kids Table Pietasters Victims Of Circumstance Zox
11	December 26–29, 2008	The Middle East	Mighty Mighty Bosstones Westbound Train Roll The Tanks Big Bad Bollocks Have Nots Slapshot The Attack Big D and the Kids Table Vagiant Murder Mile Tip The Van Far From Finished Cobramatics The Agents
12	December 26–29, 2009	House of Blues The Middle East	Mighty Mighty Bosstones Pilfers Razors In The Night Darkbuster Void Union Bim Skala Bim Pietasters Far From Finished Side Effects
13	December 26–28, 2010	House of Blues	Mighty Mighty Bosstones F.U.s We Are The Union Flatliners Less Than Jake DYS
14	December 28–30, 2011	House of Blues	Mighty Mighty Bosstones H_{2}O Ducky Boys Slackers Have Nots Smoking Popes Bomb The Music Industry
15	December 29–31, 2012	House of Blues	Mighty Mighty Bosstones Soul Radics Dogmatics Bouncing Souls Moufy Amazing Royal Crowns Big D and The Kids Table The Convictions
16	December 27–29, 2013	House of Blues	Mighty Mighty Bosstones; Mephiskapheles; Continental; Street Dogs with Rick Barton; Youth Brigade (band); Sam Black Church; Rebuilder
17	December 26–28, 2014	House of Blues	Mighty Mighty Bosstones; Fishbone; Big D and the Kids Table; The Interrupters; The Warning Shots; Andrew W.K. Lost City Angels
18	December 26–28, 2015	House of Blues	Mighty Mighty Bosstones; The Upper Crust (band); The Neighborhoods; The Queers; The Real Kids; Stranglehold; The Outlets
19	December 28–30, 2016	House of Blues	Mighty Mighty Bosstones; The Skatalites; The Planet Smashers; The Porkers; Peelander-Z; The Skints; Los Kung-Fu Monkeys
20	December 28–30, 2017	House of Blues	Mighty Mighty Bosstones; Piebald (band); The Doped Up Dollies; Vic Ruggiero; Rude Bones; The Pietasters; Kicked in the Head
21	December 28–30, 2018	House of Blues	Mighty Mighty Bosstones; The Aggrolites; Stray Bullets; Bedouin Soundclash; R.W.W. (Reggae Workers of the World); Color Killer
22	December 27–29, 2019	House of Blues	Mighty Mighty Bosstones; Art Thieves; Walker Raiders; Suicide Machines; Rebuilder; Big D and the Kids Table

== Recordings ==
- Live from the Middle East, a Mighty Mighty Bosstones live album recorded over 5 days at the 1997 Throwdown
