= Dennis Brockenborough =

American musician

- Origin: Delaware
- Occupation: Musician
- Instrument: Trombone
- Formerly of: The Mighty Mighty Bosstones

Dennis Brockenborough is an American musician who played trombone in The Mighty Mighty Bosstones for ten years and was an important contributor to the band's brass instrument-driven skacore sound.

Brockenborough joined the Mighty Mighty Bosstones in 1990 just before the release of the Where'd You Go? EP and the band's second album More Noise and Other Disturbances, replacing original trombonist Tim Bridwell. He had, however, made a prior cameo appearance in the "Devil's Night Out" music video. Brockenborough graduated from Brandywine High School, in the suburbs of Wilmington, Delaware, where he served as president of both his class and the band. His mother was a music teacher at David W. Harlan Elementary School and P.S. DuPont elementary school in Wilmington, and his brother was an All-State football player at Salesianum School.

While with the Mighty Mighty Bosstones, Brockenborough played a Yamaha YSL-691 trombone with a Denis Wick 4C mouthpiece. He also sang backup on songs such as "Kinder Words" and "Simmer Down." The 2000 album Pay Attention was his last recording with the band. In April of that year, Brockenborough left the Mighty Mighty Bosstones to perform with Chubby, a band he formed in which he sings lead and plays guitar. He was replaced by former Spring Heeled Jack member Chris Rhodes. Chubby released its debut album Is It Time? in 2004.
