= Chris Rhodes =

Trombone player from New Haven, Connecticut

Chris Rhodes is a trombone player from New Haven, Connecticut best known for playing trombone in several notable ska bands including Spring Heeled Jack, the Mighty Mighty Bosstones, Bim Skala Bim and the Toasters as well as Connecticut funk band, Boogie Chillin'. He has also made frequent on-stage guest appearances with bands such as Reel Big Fish, NOFX and Less Than Jake.

He was once a student at the University of Connecticut in Storrs, Connecticut where he played trombone in the marching band.

In 2007, the Mighty Mighty Bosstones reunited after a four-year hiatus. The band continued to record and perform live for the next fifteen years until its dissolution in January 2022. Since then, Rhodes has returned to performing with Spring Heeled Jack and performing occasional shows with the Toasters and The Skatalites.
