= Nate Albert =

American musician

Nathan Robert Albert (born November 26, 1970) is an American music executive, songwriter, producer and guitar player. He is currently the President of Giant Music, a division of The Azoff Company. He was previously the Executive Vice President of A&R at Warner Records, a division of Warner Music Group. He was previously Executive Vice President of A&R at Capitol Records and Senior Vice President of A&R at Republic Records. He lives in Los Angeles, California.

== Mighty Mighty Bosstones ==
Albert began his music career when he helped form The Mighty Mighty Bosstones at 13 years old, playing lead guitar for the platinum-selling band for seventeen years. During his time with the Bosstones, Albert performed on numerous television shows—including Saturday Night Live, Late Night with David Letterman, Late Night with Conan O’Brien and The Jon Stewart Show—as well as Paramount Pictures’ Amy Heckerling-directed film Clueless. Albert and the Bosstones also co-headlined Lollapalooza, Warped Tour, the Tibetan Freedom Concert and Horde Tour alongside such acts as Beck, the Beastie Boys, Pavement, Sonic Youth, Rancid and Neil Young. At the height of the Bosstones’ success, Albert left the band to pursue a degree at Brown University. He would eventually return for their final studio album in 2021.

== Republic Records ==
In 2006, Albert joined Republic Records. At Republic, Albert signed The Weeknd, Phantogram and Anberlin, orchestrated the release of the chart-topping, Academy Award-nominated soundtrack for Universal Pictures' Les Misérables, and worked on albums with such artists as Florence & the Machine, and The Lonely Island.

== Capitol Records ==
In 2016, Albert joined Capitol Records as Executive Vice President of A&R. While there he signed Maggie Rogers whose album Heard It in a Past Life debuted at Number 1 on the Billboard Album Chart. Additionally, he worked on projects with artists Cold War Kids, Troye Sivan and Calum Scott.

== Warner Records ==
In 2019, Albert joined Warner Records as Executive Vice President of A&R. While there, he signed Omar Apollo, Teddy Swims, Ricky Montgomery, and Gus Dapperton. Additionally, he worked on projects with artists Dua Lipa, Marshmello, and Roddy Ricch.

== Other projects ==
In addition to The Mighty Mighty Bosstones, Albert has produced albums by The Explosion, The Kickovers and Street Dogs, and played guitar on tracks by Phantogram, Youngblood Hawke, Street Dogs, Goldfinger and NOFX.
