= Dicky Barrett =

American singer (born 1964)

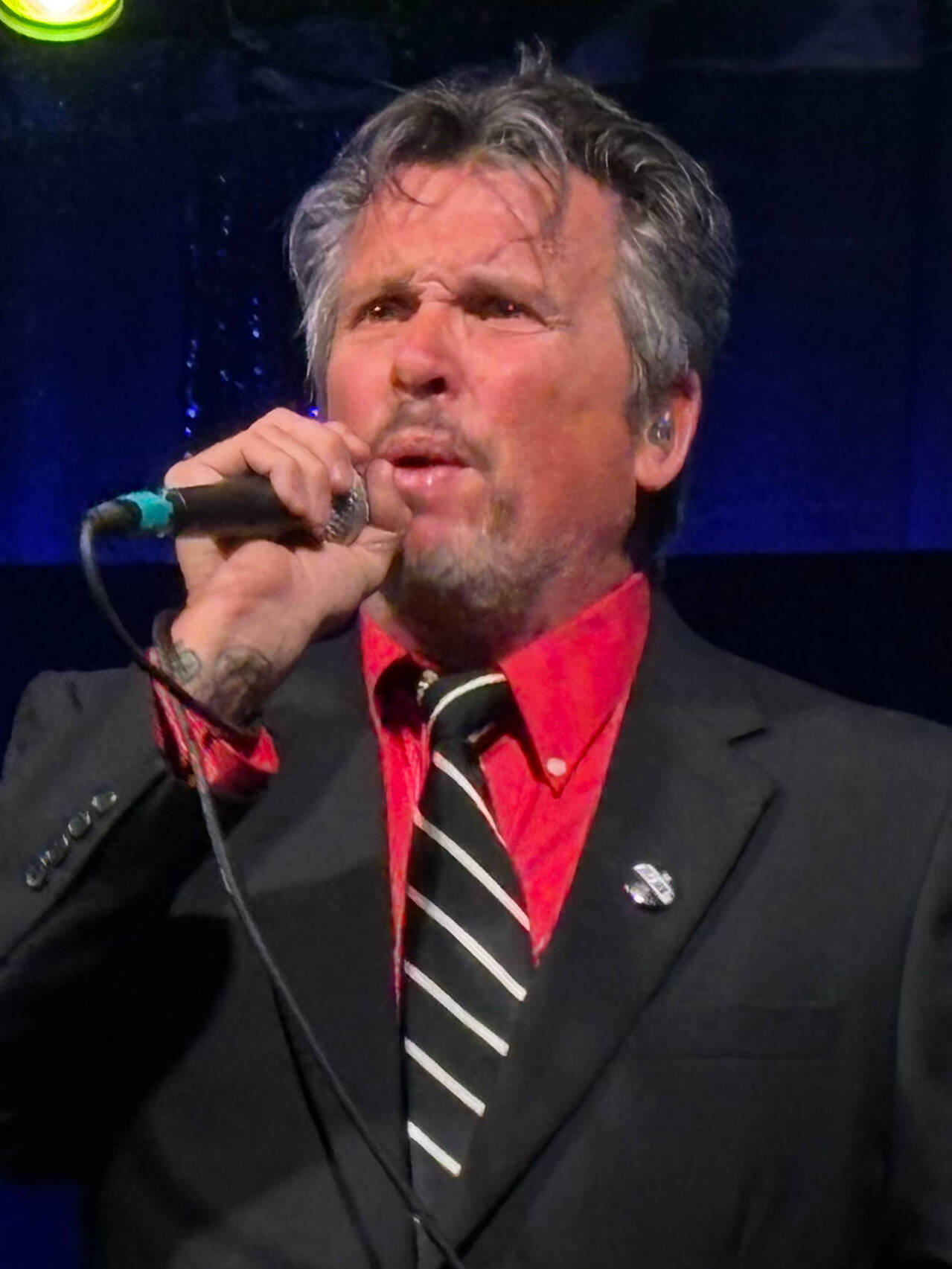
- Barrett performing with The Defiant in 2024

Background information
- Born: Richard Michael Barrett; June 22, 1964 (age 62); Providence, Rhode Island, U.S.
- Origin: Boston, Massachusetts
- Genres: Ska punk; punk rock
- Occupations: Musician; television announcer; radio personality; actor
- Instrument: Vocals
- Years active: 1983–present
- Labels: Taang!; Mercury; Big Rig; SideOneDummy
- Member of: The Mighty Mighty Bosstones; The Defiant
- Formerly of: Toxic Toast; Cheapskates; Impact Unit
- Website: www.thedefiantofficial.com

Richard Michael Barrett (born June 22, 1964), better known as Dicky Barrett, is an American singer who is the frontman of ska punk band the Mighty Mighty Bosstones. He was the announcer for Jimmy Kimmel Live! from 2004 until 2022. Barrett is known for his distinctive, loud, gravelly voice.

The Mighty Mighty Bosstones officially announced their breakup through their official website and social media feeds on January 27, 2022. Barrett revealed that the breakup occurred in part due to his views on the COVID-19 vaccine. Barrett went on to co-found and front the punk band the Defiant. In 2027, Barrett is set to relaunch the Mighty Mighty Bosstones, with a new lineup rumored.

== Early life ==
Born in Providence, Rhode Island, Barrett attended Norwood Junior High School and Xaverian Brothers High School in Massachusetts. He left Xaverian Brothers High School and went on to Norwood Senior High in Norwood, Massachusetts, and later Bunker Hill Community College where he met future Bosstones drummer Joe Sirois.

== Career ==
=== Music ===
Prior to his association with the Bosstones, Barrett played in the local Boston area bands Cheapskates, Toxic Toast, and Impact Unit. Toxic Toast would later be immortalized in a Bosstones song of the same name on the group's 1994 album Question the Answers.

Barrett spent the majority of his musical career playing with the Mighty Mighty Bosstones. He provided vocals across the band’s entire discography. Barrett toured with the band across the world continuously until their announcement of a hiatus in December 2003. The band's 1997 release, Let's Face It, would prove to be the band's biggest break, mostly due to the first single "The Impression That I Get," which charted at number one on the Billboard charts.

In 2003, Barrett began working on an untitled solo album. The album was said to be a radical departure from the ska-core sound made popular by the Bosstones. Barrett was quoted as saying that the album will be "more sombre, darker". Fellow Bosstone, Lawrence Katz, was said to be assisting Barrett with the recording of the album. However, the album remains unreleased.

Barrett appeared on two Brain Failure tracks, which are featured on their split entitled Beijing to Boston with Big D and the Kids Table.

Barrett provided guest vocals on the Street Dogs song "Justifiable Fisticuffs" from their first album Savin Hill, the Gaslight Anthem song "The Patient Ferris Wheel" from their album The '59 Sound, "Charge into the Sun" from the Briggs' album Come All You Madmen, the Unseen's cover of "Paint It Black" from the album State of Discontent, H2O songs "Force Field" and "Faster Than the World" from their 1999 album F.T.T.W., and Rancid's songs "Cash, Culture and Violence" and "Black Lung" on their album Life Won't Wait. He also made guest appearances on tracks from No Use for a Name, Clowns for Progress, the Stubborn All-Stars, and local Boston band Darkbuster.

Barrett announced that the tenth official Hometown Throwdown would occur between December 26–30, 2007 at Cambridge, Massachusetts' famed Middle East after a five-year hiatus. Barrett also confirmed that the Bosstones would be performing, although he seemed unwilling to confirm any long-term plans for the band. The Bosstones also performed on New Year's Eve 2007 in Providence, Rhode Island.

The Bosstones returned to the recording studio to record three new songs, which were included with unreleased material and vinyl B-sides on a collection titled Medium Rare released on December 18, 2007.

In January 2022, Rolling Stone reported that Barrett had produced a song and music video for Robert F. Kennedy Jr. to promote an anti-vaccine rally. Five days later, the Bosstones announced on Facebook and their website that they were breaking up. Though the band did not state the reason for the breakup, Rolling Stone speculated that it was related to Barrett's involvement in the song and video. News of his involvement with Kennedy and the band's breakup came two weeks after Barrett left Jimmy Kimmel Live!. Barrett confirmed that the breakup occurred in part due to his views on the COVID-19 vaccine.

On March 6, 2023, it was announced that Barrett had formed a new band with members of the Offspring, Street Dogs, Smash Mouth and the Briggs called the Defiant. The group released their debut album in October 2023.

In November 2026, it was announced that the Mighty Mighty Bosstones were returning to play the Hollywood Bowl in May 2027, alongside Madness, Dance Hall Crashers, Goldfinger and Reel Big Fish. While initially teased as a reunion, it was later rumored that Barrett had hired a completely new backing band. Ben Carr confirmed he would not be involved.

=== Radio ===
Barrett became the host of his own radio show, the Mighty Morning Show on Los Angeles radio's Indie 103.1 FM from 2005 until his firing on March 22, 2006.

He was a regular on three of Boston's rock stations: WAAF, WBCN, and WFNX.

On the April 13, 2009 episode of The Adam Carolla Show podcast, Dicky Barrett was Adam's guest. Over the years, he has also been a regular guest on Adam's former show, Loveline.

He was a guest on Bill Simmons' The B.S. Report podcast on December 8, 2009, with Cousin Sal and Super Dave Osborne.

=== On screen ===
Barrett first reached a national TV audience appearing with the Mighty Mighty Bosstones in an ad for Converse shoes in 1991. In the mid-1990s, Barrett appeared as a bus driver on the Nickelodeon show Bus No 9. In 1995, he appeared with the rest of the Bosstones in the film Clueless, playing at a fraternity party.

While with the Bosstones, Barrett performed on several television shows, including Saturday Night Live, The Jon Stewart Show, as well as Sesame Street's Elmopalooza.

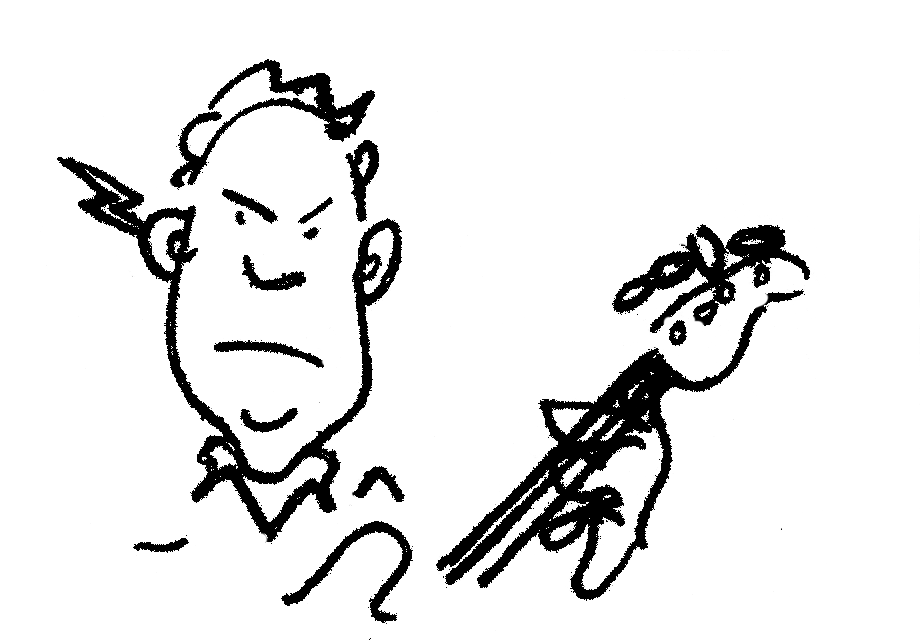
Barrett's caricature of bassist Jimmy Earl, drawn on the set of Jimmy Kimmel Live!

Barrett portrays a prison inmate in the 1999 film Big Helium Dog.

In 2004, after the Bosstones went on hiatus, Barrett became the announcer for ABC's Jimmy Kimmel Live!. That year he also had a cameo role in the film Home of Phobia which was screened at the Sundance Film Festival. Barrett was released from his obligation to Jimmy Kimmel Live! in 2022 when he reportedly refused to be vaccinated against COVID-19.

Barrett has also done voice-over work for Minoriteam and appears in the documentary film American Hardcore. He has appeared on an episode of Criss Angel's Mind Freak. He also portrayed rock pioneer Bill Haley in the miniseries Shake, Rattle, and Roll: An American Love Story.

== Personal life ==
Barrett lives in Phoenix, Arizona with his wife and two children. He is an Irish Catholic.

Barrett has been an outspoken supporter of Robert F. Kennedy Jr. and endorsed Kennedy's run for President of the United States of America in the 2024 United States presidential election.
