= Joe Sirois =

American drummer (born 1972)

- Born: January 25, 1972 (age 54)
- Origin: Andover, Massachusetts, United States
- Genres: Rock
- Occupation: Drummer
- Formerly of: The Mighty Mighty Bosstones, Street Dogs, Bash & Pop

Joe Sirois (born January 25, 1972) is an American drummer who is best known for having been a member of The Mighty Mighty Bosstones. He also played drums for the Boston-based band Street Dogs from 2004 to 2007.

== Life and career ==
Sirois, who grew up in Andover, Massachusetts, knew Bosstone's frontman Dicky Barrett from time shared at Bunker Hill Community College. He replaced original Bosstones drummer Josh Dalsimer on the band's first American tour and played on their second album, More Noise and Other Disturbances, and subsequent albums.

Sirois plays on Yamaha Maple Custom series drums with a twenty-inch kick, Sabian cymbals, a twelve-inch tom, a fourteen-inch tom, and a sixteen-inch tom.

The Street Dogs have recorded two albums with him, Back to the World and Fading American Dream. Joe has also drummed for punk rock bands Roll The Tanks, Jackson United, Bash & Pop, The Aggrolites, and Frank Black and the Catholics.

He currently drums for Bash & Pop.
