= Joe Gittleman =

American musician

- Born: April 6, 1968 (age 58); Cambridge, Massachusetts
- Genres: Ska-core, punk rock
- Instrument: Bass guitar
- Formerly of: The Mighty Mighty Bosstones

Joe Gittleman (born April 6, 1968, in Cambridge, Massachusetts) is an American musician, best known as the bass guitar player for The Mighty Mighty Bosstones. His proficiency on bass earned him the nickname "the Bass Fiddleman."

== Career ==
Gittleman originally played guitar in The Mighty Mighty Bosstones, but he switched roles with former member Nate Albert when he realized he had a better bass than guitar. He has also played bass in Gang Green and sang in and produced records for his band Avoid One Thing.

He provided background vocals for the Street Dogs' 2005 album Back to the World as well as the more recent Fading American Dream. In addition, Gittleman produced The Briggs' new album Back to Higher Ground as well as the Flogging Molly album Whiskey on a Sunday, Big D and the Kids Table's albums Strictly Rude and Fluent In Stroll and Chuck Ragan's CD "Los Feliz". Gittleman has also written songs for bands such as MxPx ("Heard That Sound") and has seen Avoid One Thing covered by The Bouncing Souls ("Lean on Sheena").

Since 2005, Gittleman has been a full-time staff producer and A+R for the Los-Angeles-based independent label Side One Dummy Records. While in Italy in 1993 with The Mighty Mighty Bosstones, Gittleman was stabbed in the chest by an Albanian bootlegger. This was documented in the song "The Pirate Ship" on the vinyl release of Question the Answers.

Gittleman began working as an instructor at Northern Vermont University in Lyndonville, Vermont. On May 16, 2012, he was promoted to assistant professor. On July 1, 2023, Northern Vermont University became Vermont State University, for which Gittleman teaches seven different classes, primarily about the music industry.

== Artistry ==
=== Composing ===
Gittleman has been credited as the composer for at least 122 songs/albums. The list is as follows:

==== Undated ====
Most undated credits involve a song being repurposed for another piece of work.

- Snow Day, music from the motion picture, Various Artists
- Rrrrrock, ???
- Right Here Where You Left Me, Avoid One Thing
- Rascal King, The Mighty Mighty Bosstones
- Drew's Famous Instrumental Modern Rock Collection Vol. 6, Various Artists
- Digimon: The Movie, Original Soundtrack
- CAPS: Campus and Pub Songs, Various artists

==== 1989-1999 ====
- Older..., Gang Green, 1989
- More Noise and Other Disturbances, The Mighty Mighty Bosstones, 1992
- Simmer Down, The Mighty Mighty Bosstones, 1993
- Alternation, Various Artists, 1994
- Ska-Core, The Devil and More, The Mighty Mighty Bosstones, 1994
- Safe and Sound: A Benefit in Response to the Brookline Clinic Violence, Various Artists, 1996
- Let's Face It, The Mighty Mighty Bosstones, 1997
- Pop Hits Vol. 63, Various Artists, 1997
- Pop/Rock Picks Oct. 1997 Vol. 1, Various Artists, 1997
- 100% Hits Vol. 26, Various Artists, 1998
- A Compilation of Warped Music, Various Artists, 1998
- Live From the Middle East, The Mighty Mighty Bosstones, 1998
- Meet the Deedles, Original Soundtrack, 1998
- Next Generation of Swing, Various Artists, 1998
- Shine Vol. 10, Various Artists, 1998
- Ska Trax: New Generation, Various Artists, 1998
- X-Games Vol. 3, Various Artists, 1998
- Ka-Boom!, Various Artists, 1999
- Ska Party '99, Various Artists, 1999
- Total Hits Vol. 2, Various Artists, 1999

==== 2000-2010 ====
- City Rocks: Boston, Various Artists, 2000
- Digimon [Warner Bros.], Original Soundtrack, 2000
- Naked-4-Play, Various Artists, 2000
- Pay Attention, The Mighty Mighty Bosstones, 2000
- Royal, The Amazing Crowns, 2000
- Snow Day, Original Soundtrack, 2000
- Stop Handgun Violence, Various Artists, 2000
- World Warped Vol. 3: Live, Various Artists, 2000
- Awfully Quiet, The Mighty Mighty Bosstones, 2001
- Warped Tour: 2001 Compilation, Various Artistis, 2001
- A Jackknife to a Swan, The Mighty Mighty Bosstones, 2002
- Atticus: Dragging the Lake, Various Artists, 2002
- Avoid One Thing, Avoid One Thing, 2002
- Mighty Mighty Bosstones/Madcap [Split CD], The Mighty Mighty Bosstones/Madcap, 2002
- Total Rock, Various Artists, 2002
- Atticus: Dragging the Lake Vol. 2, Various Artists, 2003
- Balls, Various Artists, 2003
- Outlaw Volleyball:Xbox, Original Soundtrack, 2003
- Warped Tour 2003, Various Artists, 2003
- You Got It/Older... (Budweiser), Gang Green, 2003
- Chopstick Bridge, Avoid One Thing, 2004
- Warped Tour 2004, Various Artists, 2004
- Panic, MxPx, 2005
- The Gold Record, The Bouncing Souls, 2006
- 90's Rock Number 1's, Various Artists, 2007
- Country-Rebel, Dave Smith, 2007

==== 2011-Current ====
- Don't Forget Your Roots, H20/H20, 2011
- The Magic of Youth, The Mighty Mighty Bosstones, 2011
- 100 Hits: Driving Rock [2013], Various Artists, 2013
- Icon, The Mighty Mighty Bosstones, 2014
- 20 No. 1's: Alternative Rock, 2015
- Wavebreaker #4, Joe Gittleman/Bad Operation, 2023
- Hold Up, Joe Gittleman, 2024
