= Where I Find My Heaven (album) =

Compilation album by Gigolo Aunts
- Released: 1997
- Genre: Rock, Alternative, Power Pop
- Label: Nectar Masters (UK) (1997); Fire Records (UK) (1998)
- Producer: Mike Denneen

Professional ratings
Review scores
Source	Rating
NME	2/10
Uncut	4/5 stars

Where I Find My Heaven is a compilation album by Gigolo Aunts released in the UK, first on Nectar Masters (1997), and then on Fire Records (1998). The album collects a number of singles and b-sides from 1993 through 1995. The album includes a cover of "Winsor Dam", a 1991 recording by Big Dipper that did not receive its formal release until the 2008 compilation album Supercluster: The Big Dipper Anthology.

== Track listing ==
UK Version (Nectar Masters) Catalog Number: NTMCD549 (1997)
UK Version (Fire Records) Catalog Number: FIRECD71 (1998)

1. "Cope" (Brouwer, Gibbs, Hurley, Hurley) 3:50
2. "Bloom" (Brouwer, Gibbs, Hurley, Hurley) 4:00
3. "That's O.K." (Brouwer, Gibbs, Hurley, Hurley) 3:59
4. "Gun" (Brouwer, Gibbs, Hurley, Hurley) 4:40
5. "Take Me On" (Brouwer, Gibbs, Hurley, Hurley) 2:34
6. "Walk Among Us" (Brouwer, Gibbs, Hurley, Hurley) 4:21
7. "Serious Drugs" (Duglas T. Stewart, Norman Blake, Joe McAlinden) 3:57
8. "Mrs. Washington" (Brouwer, Gibbs, Hurley, Hurley) 4:06
9. "Ask" (Morrissey/Johnny Marr) 2:24
10. "Winsor Dam" (Bill Goffrier, Jeff Oliphant, Steve Michener, Gary Waleik) 4:40
11. "Where I Find My Heaven" (Brouwer, Gibbs, Hurley, Hurley) 3:25
12. "Ride On Baby Ride On" (Brouwer, Gibbs, Hurley, Hurley) 5:17
13. "Lemon Peeler" (Brouwer, Gibbs, Hurley, Hurley) 3:28
14. "Shame" (Brouwer, Gibbs, Hurley, Hurley) 4:03
15. "Weird Sister" (Brouwer, Gibbs, Hurley, Hurley) 3:52
