= Supercluster: The Big Dipper Anthology =

Compilation album by Big Dipper
- Released: March 18, 2008
- Genre: Alternative rock, indie rock, jangle pop
- Label: Merge

Big Dipper chronology
Slam (1990)	Supercluster: The Big Dipper Anthology (2008)	Big Dipper Crashes on the Platinum Planet (2012)

Professional ratings
Review scores
Source	Rating
Pitchfork	7.8/10

Supercluster: The Big Dipper Anthology is a 3-disc release by Boston indie rock band Big Dipper, released March 18, 2008, by Merge Records. The set contains the band's debut EP, Boo-Boo, and their first two full-length albums, Heavens and Craps. Supercluster also contains various bonus tracks and 15 songs which were recorded after their final album, Slam.

The collection's introduction was written by Tom Scharpling of The Best Show and Scharpling and Wurster.

The song "Winsor Dam" was covered by Gigolo Aunts on the "Mrs. Washington" single, and included on that band's Where I Find My Heaven compilation album.

== Track listing ==
Disc 1 (Boo-Boo/Heavens)
No.	Title	Length
1.	"Faith Healer"	3:02
2.	"San Quentin, CA"	2:03
3.	"What in Sam Hill...?"	3:03
4.	"Wrong in the Charts"	2:58
5.	"Ancers"	2:26
6.	"Loch Ness Monster"	2:58
7.	"She's Fetching"	2:37
8.	"Man o'War"	2:41
9.	"Easter Eve"	3:37
10.	"Humason"	2:56
11.	"Lunar Module"	4:48
12.	"All Going Out Together"	2:57
13.	"Younger Bums"	2:57
14.	"When Men Were Trains"	2:29
15.	"Wet Weekend"	3:15
16.	"Mr. Woods"	3:12

Disc 2 (Craps)
No.	Title	Length
1.	"Meet the Witch"	3:55
2.	"Ron Klaus Wrecked His House"	5:05
3.	"The Insane Girl"	3:39
4.	"Semjáse"	4:37
5.	"Stardom Because"	4:00
6.	"Bonnie"	3:46
7.	"Hey! Mr. Lincoln"	3:35
8.	"Bells of Love"	3:15
9.	"A Song to Be Beautiful"	4:06
10.	"Golden Shame"	1:41
11.	"Lou Gehrig's Disease"	3:47
12.	"You're Not Patsy"	2:29
13.	"San Quentin, CA"	2:18
14.	"Which Would You Rather"	2:34
15.	"He Is God"	2:16
16.	"Guitar Named Desire"	1:54
17.	"Ron Klaus Demo'd His House"	5:11
18.	"Life Inside the Cemetery"	3:45

Disc 3 (Very Loud Array)
No.	Title	Length
1.	"Wake Up the King"	3:25
2.	"Edith"	3:27
3.	"The Beast"	2:51
4.	"Restaurant Cloud"	3:11
5.	"Missing Time"	2:59
6.	"Beginning of the End"	2:45
7.	"Lifetime Achievement Award"	3:08
8.	"Dead River"	3:04
9.	"Silentium"	2:40
10.	"Approach of a Human Being"	4:30
11.	"Mineral Man"	2:48
12.	"The Ghost of Emily"	4:25
13.	"Winsor Dam"	4:53
14.	"Nowhere to Put My Love"	3:44
15.	"Extraordinary Worm"	3:27
