= The Best Show with Tom Scharpling =

Internet radio show/podcast hosted by Tom Scharpling

- The Best Show with Tom Scharpling
- Genre: Talk, Comedy, Music
- Running time: 2 hours (2000–2001); 3 hours (2001–2013, 2014–)
- Country of origin: United States
- Starring: Tom Scharpling; Jon Wurster; Mike Lisk (2005–); Pat Byrne (2014-); Jason Gore (2014-2025)
- Produced by: Forever Dog Productions
- Recording studio: Los Angeles
- Other studios: Jersey City
- Original release: On WFMU: October 10, 2000 – December 17, 2013; Independent revival: December 16, 2014–present
- Opening theme: "Best Show Theme" by Islands
- Other themes: "Best Show Theme" by Themeweavers "Best Show Theme" by Mr. and Mrs. Paycheck
- Website: thebestshow.net
- Podcast: thebestshow.libsyn.com/rss

The Best Show with Tom Scharpling (formerly The Best Show on WFMU) is a combination music, call-in, and comedy Internet radio show and podcast hosted independently by Tom Scharpling since 2014, which previously aired on New Jersey-based radio station WFMU from 2000 to 2013. The show's slogan is "three hours of mirth, music, and mayhem."

The Best Show on WFMU first aired on October 10, 2000, occupying the 9 to 11 p.m. time slot. The current incarnation of The Best Show continues to air on Tuesday evenings on YouTube from the studios of Forever Dog in Los Angeles.

On December 27, 2016, the show began accepting donations through Patreon, providing ancillary content and spin-off shows. The show has also spawned an Adult Swim special, several album releases on Scharpling & Wurster's Stereolaffs label and Third Man Records, and a 16-disc Numero Group box set.

The show has a fanbase, who call themselves "Friends of Tom," with listeners and callers from the United States, Canada, the U.K., Sweden, Japan, New Zealand, and Tasmania.

== Background ==
While a DJ at WFMU, Tom Scharpling took the first scripted, on-air call from longtime friend Jon Wurster, who at the time was the drummer for the band Superchunk. Posing as the fictional Ronald Thomas Clontle, he claimed to be the author of a book called Rock, Rot & Rule, hailed as "the Ultimate Argument Settler," in which he irrationally classifies various music acts that either "rock," "rot," or "rule." Genuine callers of the show irately debated Clontle’s arrogance and historical inaccuracies.

Subsequently, Scharpling and Wurster began to envision a radio show devoted to that type of humor on a weekly basis, inspired partly by the Upright Citizen’s Brigade and the East Village alternative comedy show Eating It.

=== The Best Show on WFMU (2000–2013) ===
Scharpling hosted the first episode of The Best Show on WFMU on October 10, 2000. Beginning on June 5, 2001, the show was expanded to three hours filling the 8 to 11 p.m. slot. It later moved to 9 p.m. to midnight on June 15, 2010.

The program featured a roster of genuine callers, as well as calls in-character from Wurster and occasional in-character calls from H. Jon Benjamin, Jon Glaser, Peyton Reed and others.

Wurster adopted a variety of personae hailing from the fictional and surreal suburb of Newbridge, New Jersey. Frequent characters include Philly Boy Roy (an unflinching supporter of all things Philadelphia), Timmy von Trimble (a genetically modified, two-inch-tall racist), and the Gorch (a senior citizen who claims that the character of the Fonz on the TV show Happy Days was based on him without permission).

Regular callers and in-studio guests of note have included Todd Barry, Andy Kindler, Aimee Mann, Kurt Vile, Paul F. Tompkins, Ted Leo, John Hodgman, and Patton Oswalt.

Popular bits on the show included Scharpling's slow burn takedowns of pop culture minutiae such as Billy Crystal's "jazz man" routine and an infomercial promoting the Gathering of the Juggalos festival, which inspired an SNL sketch. Similarly, memorable segments have come from Scharpling recalling his trip to a Beatles convention and an awkward encounter with Patti Smith.

A worldwide audience listened to the show live through WFMU's Internet stream with episodes also archived on the radio station's website. The Best Show began podcasting its episodes (with the music removed due to licensing restrictions) on January 26, 2006.

In October 2013, Scharpling announced his intention to end the Best Show, with the program's finale airing on December 17.

=== The Best Show with Tom Scharpling (since 2014) ===
On December 16, 2014, Scharpling revived the program independently at thebestshow.net, recording from a studio in Jersey City.

The show featured a greater emphasis on lists and call-in segments as well as featuring producers Mike Lisk, Jason Gore, and Pat Byrne.

In 2015, Scharpling & Wurster made an appearance on Late Night with Seth Meyers. The pair voiced characters on an episode of The Simpsons in 2016. Scharpling detailed the genesis of the show in his best-selling book, It Never Ends.

The show currently takes place in Los Angeles from the Forever Dog studios in North Hollywood. This new iteration of the show includes a live video stream on Twitch, a greater emphasis on musical performances, and two 24-hour episodes, which have featured guest appearances by Bill Hader, Conan O'Brien, Jarvis Cocker, Nathan Fielder, Bob Odenkirk, and Sarah Squirm.

== Guests ==
Actors

- Patricia Arquette
- Jack Black
- John Ross Bowie
- Kevin Corrigan
- Illeana Douglas
- Dan Eberle
- Sharon Horgan
- Jerry Ferrara
- Ellie Kemper
- Griffin Newman
- Lisa Jane Persky
- Paul Rudd
- Tony Shalhoub
- Molly Shannon
- Danny Tamberelli
- James Urbaniak
- Yvonne Zima

Artists & Animators

- Coop
- Nathan Gelgud
- Jeff T. Owens
- Ian Jones-Quartey
- Perry Shall
- Rebecca Sugar
- Genndy Tartakovsky
- Julia Vickerman
- Pendleton Ward
- Eric White

Comedians

- James Adomian
- Aziz Ansari
- Fred Armisen
- Maria Bamford
- Julian Barratt
- Todd Barry
- Vanessa Bayer
- Max Beasley
- Derrick Beckles
- H. Jon Benjamin
- Beck Bennett
- Matt Berry
- Kurt Braunohler
- Andy Breckman
- David Brown
- Colin Burgess
- Sally Burtnick
- River Butcher
- Zach Cherry
- Carmen Christopher
- Nick Ciarelli
- Andrew "Dice" Clay
- Sean Clements
- Adam Conover
- Lizzy Cooperman
- Andrew Daly
- Jon Daly
- Hayes Davenport
- Brett Davis
- Gabe Delahaye
- DJ Douggpound
- John Early
- Abby Elliott
- Bridey Elliott
- Chris Elliott
- Brad Evans
- Nathan Fielder
- Noel Fielding
- Jo Firestone
- Joe Flaherty
- Nick Flanagan
- Chris Fleming
- Jake Fogelnest
- Marina Franklin
- Adam Friedland
- James Fritz
- Jim Gaffigan
- Zach Galifianakis
- Chris Gethard
- Jon Glaser
- Gary Gulman
- Bill Hader
- Neil Hamburger
- Tim Heidecker
- Sara Hennessey
- Roz Hernandez
- Dave Hill
- John Hodgman
- Mary Houlihan
- Rob Huebel
- James Austin Johnson
- Martha Kelly
- Andy Kindler
- Jen Kirkman
- Julie Klausner
- Megan Koester
- Joe Kwaczala
- Mekki Leeper
- Dan Licata
- Jamie Loftus
- Joe Mande
- Sunita Mani
- Marc Maron
- Kevin McDonald
- Tommy McNamara
- Tallie Medel
- Kyle Mooney
- Bobby Moynihan
- John Mulaney
- Griffin Newman
- Conan O'Brien
- Bob Odenkirk
- Clare O'Kane
- Conner O'Malley
- Rashida Olayiwola
- John Oliver
- Patton Oswalt
- Adam Pally
- Chris Parnell
- Joe Pera
- DC Pierson
- Robert Popper
- Mark Proksch
- Bryan Quinby
- Eric Rahill
- Connor Ratliff
- Jonah Ray
- Ian Roberts
- Scott Rogowsky
- Horatio Sanz
- Kristen Schaal
- Paul Scheer
- Sam Seder
- Anna Seregina
- Sarah Sherman
- Martin Short
- Sarah Silverman
- The Sloppy Boys
- Yakov Smirnoff
- Dana Snyder
- Steve-O
- Alison Stevenson
- Carl Tart
- Luke Taylor
- Whitmer Thomas
- Scott Thompson
- Paul F. Tompkins
- Gregg Turkington
- Sal Vulcano
- Matt Walsh
- Michaela Watkins
- Eric Wareheim
- Alice Wetterlund
- Dave Willis
- Bridger Winegar

Filmmakers & Writers

- Lance Bangs
- Puloma Basu
- Bradley Beesley
- Vic Berger IV
- Ryan Martin Brown
- Mary Bronstein
- Ronald Bronstein
- Don Coscarelli
- David Farrier
- Jeff Feuerzeig
- Josh Margolin
- Robert Hatch-Miller
- Todd Haynes
- Alex R. Johnson
- Matt Johnson
- Phil Morrison
- Lance Oppenheim
- Danny Plotnick
- Kelly Reichardt
- Peyton Reed
- Andrew Reich
- Benny Safdie
- Lynn Shelton
- Kevin Smith
- Mike White
- Jason Woliner

Musicians

- A Giant Dog
- Damian Abraham
- Steve Albini
- Jon Auer
- Automatic
- Alvvays
- Danny Ayala
- Lou Barlow
- Being Dead
- Big Joanie
- Boss Hog
- Peter Buck
- Luther "Uncle Luke" Campbell
- Greg Cartwright
- Chaki the Funk Wizard
- Jarvis Cocker
- C.O.F.F.I.N
- Chris Cohen
- Jess Cornelius
- Martin Courtney
- Mikal Cronin
- David Crosby
- DAIISTAR
- Danielson Familie
- Diners
- Deer Tick
- Eyelids
- Fat Tony
- Delores Galore
- Generacion Suicida
- Ben Gibbard
- Madeline Goldstein
- Kim Gordon
- The Gregory Brothers
- Paul Grimstad
- Neil Hagerty
- Paul Hanley
- Frankie Cosmos
- Rob Halford
- Illuminati Hotties
- Syl Johnson
- Kesha
- King Tuff
- Mike Krol
- Mary Lattimore
- Ben Lee
- Ted Leo
- Fenne Lily
- Love Child
- Trey Magnifique
- Fred Maher
- Aimee Mann
- Cristina Martinez
- J Mascis
- Nellie McKay
- Mdou Moctar
- Meatbodies
- Jackie Mendoza
- MGMT
- James Murphy
- Lael Neale
- Carl Newman
- No Joy
- Open Mike Eagle
- Optic Sink
- Osees
- Palehound
- Pissed Jeans
- Previous Industries
- Quivers
- Real Estate
- Redd Kross
- Daniel Romano
- Sedona
- Jon Spencer
- Shannon Shaw
- Sheer Mag
- Skegss
- Special Interest
- Marnie Stern
- Sudan Archives
- Sweeping Promises
- System Exclusive
- Nick Thorburn
- Mary Timony
- Maylee Todd
- Torres
- Tropical Fuck Storm
- Tyvek
- Vampire Weekend
- John Vanderslice
- El Vez
- Kurt Vile
- Andrew W.K.
- Water from Your Eyes
- Miss Alex White
- Dave Wyndorf

Writers & Authors

- Scott Alexander and Larry Karaszewski
- Michael Azerrad
- Duffy Boudreau
- Paul Collins
- Andrew Earles *
- Matt Fraction
- John Hodgman
- Michael Kupperman
- Bob Mehr
- Neal Pollack
- David Rees
- Stefani Robinson
- Rob Schrab
- Andrew Weinberg
- Andy Zax
- Chip Zdarsky

Other

- The Amazing Kreskin
- Big Dipper
- Chapo Trap House
- Colt Cabana
- Orange Cassidy
- RJ City
- Heidi N Closet
- Siri Dahl
- Aiden English
- Pat Finnerty
- Ronald Gladden
- Jaida Essence Hall
- Meatball
- Nardwuar
- Willow Nightingale

== Critical Reception & Influence ==
The Best Show is widely regarded as a seminal and highly influential precursor to the modern comedy podcast. Airing for years before the podcast boom of the mid-2000s, its format—featuring a host, recurring characters, listener call-ins, and a focus on building an intricate comedic universe—provided a blueprint for many successful programs that followed. Scharpling has joked, "If this is what I birthed, what hath I wrought?”

Notable fans of The Best Show include Conan O'Brien, Neal Pollack, David Cross, and Aiden English. Musician Kurt Vile wrote a song about calling into the show.

Rolling Stone has frequently listed the show on its "Best Podcasts" lists, commenting, "New Jersey-based extravaganza The Best Show on WFMU rivaled the laugh-per-minute ratio and creative imagination of any late-night TV talk show, but with none of the budget."

The New York Times called the show hugely influential, praising the show's "conversational, slow-burn comedy."

Vulture called Scharpling & Wurster one of "the most consistently funny and hardworking teams in comedy" and listed The Best Show as one of "10 Essential Comedy Podcasts That Shaped The Genre.”

== Legacy ==
=== The Majority Report ===
On February 11, 2003, Janeane Garofalo and Sam Seder appeared on The Best Show to discuss the political atmosphere of America. The chemistry between them as radio talents was evident, and their agreement on many liberal political views made them kindred spirits. In the summer of that year, Garofalo was approached by representatives of Air America Radio to be a radio personality for their programming. She insisted that they hire Seder and that he share the hosting responsibilities. Less than one year later, The Majority Report was born.

=== Big Dipper reunion ===
On his January 20, 2004 radio program, Scharpling talked derisively about the VH1 show Bands Reunited. The discussion led to Scharpling facetiously declaring his goal of reuniting the beloved (though relatively unknown) 1980s Boston indie-rock band Big Dipper. In the following weeks, the concept of a Big Dipper reunion had become a recurring in-joke on the program. Scharpling began calling the members at home to convince them to reunite. In 2008, the group reunited for a live concert. In advance of several reunion shows in April 2008, Merge Records released the three-disc set Supercluster: The Big Dipper Anthology on March 18, featuring liner notes by Scharpling.

Numero Group's Best of the Best Show box set cover art.

=== The Best of The Best Show box set ===
On May 12, 2015, the Numero Group released the Best of the Best Show, a retrospective box set of Scharpling & Wurster calls culled primarily from the show's 13-year run on WFMU, on 16 discs and a USB stick with bonus material. It also includes a book of essays written by friends and associates of the show and notes on every included call by Scharpling & Wurster themselves.

=== Adult Swim's "We're Newbridge" special ===
In 2014, Scharpling and Wurster created, produced, and starred in a television special entitled the Newbridge Tourism Board Presents: "We're Newbridge, We're Comin' to Get Ya!" for Adult Swim's late-night series Infomercials. The show presents itself as a tourism video advertising for the fictional town of Newbridge, New Jersey and features Robert Cuthill, Julie Klausner, Gilbert Gottfried, and others. It included live-action portrayals of many Best Show characters. It aired on November 3, 2014.

== Spin-offs and Patreon exclusives ==
Through the Best Show's Patreon, the show has spawned numerous spin-off shows:

- Best Show Gems / Best Show Bests - A "greatest hits"-type program featuring highlights from The Best Show.
- Ask Tom / S&W Q&A - Tom Scharpling and Jon Wurster answer submitted questions out-of-character.
- The Half Hour of Power / The Four Horsemen - A bonus Best Show focusing on "Four Horsemen" Pat Byrne, AP Mike Lisk & Jason "Dudio" Gore and friends of the show.
- Meet My Friends the Friends - Patreon exclusive featuring a fictionalized version of Scharpling hosting a Friends recap podcast as his life slowly begins to unravel. The podcast has covered several seasons of the show, while creating multiple spin-offs like Quantum Leap review podcast Takin' the Leap with Jason Gore, and the SmartLess parody, Dumbmore.
- So Far / Rubinesque - Patreon exclusive limited podcasts in which the Best Show crew takes a year by year look at all of the works of Crosby, Stills, Nash & Young, together and apart, as well as the discography of Rick Rubin.
- Make Mike Marvel / Mike-A-Mania / Take Brett Out To The Ballgame - AP Mike reluctantly watches the entire Marvel Cinematic Universe and every WrestleMania with comedian Brett Davis, including all of the shows, short films and a trip to Disneyland's Avengers Campus. Later, AP Mike forces Brett to watch the 2025 Mets season.
- The John Gentle Show - Comedian Brett Davis hosts a college radio show as his poetry professor character, John Gentle, from The Special Without Brett Davis.
- Gary The Squirrel - Patreon exclusives wherein Gary the Squirrel, a Don Rickles-esque squirrel portrayed by Scharpling conducts interviews, trains the Best Show staff on improv or broadcasting, and comments on pop culture.
- The Sad Mirage - Scharpling and "AP Mike" Lisk discuss various somber topics.
- Lights Out - The Best Show staff share ghost stories, nightmares, and various other horror-related occurrences in their lives with the lights out in the studio.
- Ahoy! - Tom Scharpling and Harri Woliner discuss life while driving around Los Angeles reviewing fast food fish sandwiches.

== See also ==
- Scharpling & Wurster
