= Mrs. Washington =

Single by Gigolo Aunts

from the album Flippin' Out
- Released: August 1993
- Genre: Pop
- Length: 4:48
- Label: Fire
- Songwriters: Dave Gibbs, Phil Hurley, Steve Hurley, Paul Brouwer
- Producer: Mike Denneen

Gigolo Aunts singles chronology
"Where I Find My Heaven" (1993)	"Mrs. Washington" (1993)	"Gun" (1993)

"Mrs. Washington" is a song written and performed by Gigolo Aunts and the title song from their 1993 and 1994 singles. The song also appears on the album, Flippin' Out. The August 1993 7" single (catalog number: SM1 or 7SM1) includes a cover of "Serious Drugs", a 1992 single by BMX Bandits later included on their 1993 album, "Life Goes On". That 1993 single was the first in a series of five releases by various bands on Fire Records under the Spawning Monsters moniker. The April 1994 7" single (catalog number: blaze68) and CD single (catalog number: blaze68cd) include a cover of "Ask", a 1986 single by the Smiths that later appeared on their 1987 albums, "Louder Than Bombs" (US) and "The World Won't Listen" (UK). The 12" single includes a cover of "Can You Get to That" by Funkadelic, a song from their 1971 album, "Maggot Brain". Both the 12" single and the CD single include a cover of "Winsor Dam", a 1991 recording by Big Dipper that did not receive its formal release until the 2008 compilation album, Supercluster: The Big Dipper Anthology. Note that while both the 12" single and CD single attribute the writing credits for "Winsor Dam" to Goffrier/Oliphant/Michener/Wallik, other sources identify the writer of the song as Big Dipper guitarist, Gary Waleik. The 1994 single entered the UK singles charts on April 23, 1994, spending only one week there. The cover art of the 1994 7" single, 12" single, and CD single features Chloë Sevigny. The photo appears to be from the same session as the photo on the cover of the Full-On Bloom EP.

== Track listing ==
UK Single (Fire Records) Catalog Number: SM1 or 7SM1 (1993), Format: 7" single

1. "Mrs. Washington" (Brouwer, Gibbs, Hurley, Hurley)
2. "Serious Drugs" (Duglas T. Stewart, Norman Blake, Joe McAlinden)

UK Single (Fire Records) Catalog Number: blaze68 (1994), Format: 7" single

1. "Mrs. Washington" (Brouwer, Gibbs, Hurley, Hurley)
2. "Ask" (Morrissey, Johnny Marr)

UK Single (Fire Records) Catalog Number: blaze68t (1994), Format: 12" single

1. "Mrs. Washington" (Brouwer, Gibbs, Hurley, Hurley)
2. "Can You Get to That" (George Clinton, Ernest G. Harris, Jr.)
3. "Winsor Dam" (Bill Goffrier, Jeff Oliphant, Steve Michener, Gary Waleik)
4. "Supernova Crush" (Brouwer, Gibbs, Hurley, Hurley)

UK Single (Fire Records) Catalog Number: blaze68cd (1994), Format: CD single

1. "Mrs. Washington" (Brouwer, Gibbs, Hurley, Hurley) 4:07
2. "Ask" (Morrissey, Johnny Marr) 2:25
3. "Supernova Crush" (Brouwer, Gibbs, Hurley, Hurley) 2:18
4. "Winsor Dam" (Bill Goffrier, Jeff Oliphant, Steve Michener, Gary Waleik) 4:39
