= Minor Chords and Major Themes =

Studio album by Gigolo Aunts
- Released: February 9, 1999
- Genres: Alternative rock, power pop
- Label: E Pluribus Unum (US)
- Producer: Mike Denneen

Gigolo Aunts chronology
Learn to Play Guitar (1997)	Minor Chords and Major Themes (1999)	Everyone Can Fly (1999)

Professional ratings
Review scores
Source	Rating
AllMusic	2.5/5 stars

Minor Chords and Major Themes is a 1999 album by Gigolo Aunts. It includes the songs, "Everyone Can Fly", subsequently featured on the Everyone Can Fly EP, "Everything Is Wrong", co-written by Jane Wiedlin, and "The Big Lie", co-written by Dave Bassett. Minor Chords and Major Themes features the return of producer, Mike Denneen, who also produced the 1993 album, Flippin' Out. The track, "You'd Better Get Yourself Together, Baby" also appears on the Wicked Good Sampler 05 compilation, a 1998 promotional release associated with Newbury Comics released by Universal Music (Catalog Number: UMG3P-21141). The Japanese release of Minor Chords and Major Themes adds the track, "Kinda Girl", which also appears on the Learn to Play Guitar EP.

== Track listing ==
US Version (E Pluribus Unum Recordings) Catalog Number: EPUD 41206 (1999) EU Version (E Pluribus Unum Recordings/Geffen Records) Catalog Number: 441 206-2/EPD 41206 (1999)

1. "C'mon, C'mon" (Gibbs/Hurley) 2:36
2. "Everyone Can Fly" (Gibbs/Hurley) 4:20
3. "Half a Chance" (Gibbs/Hurley) 2:53
4. "Super Ultra Mega Wicked Love" (Gibbs/Hurley) 4:41
5. "You'd Better Get Yourself Together, Baby" (Gibbs/Hurley) 3:50
6. "Everything Is Wrong" (Gibbs/Hurley/Jane Wiedlin) 3:28
7. "The Big Lie" (Gibbs/Hurley/Dave Bassett) 3:29
8. "Simple Thing" (Gibbs/Hurley) 3:55
9. "Rest Assured" (Gibbs/Hurley) 3:31
10. "For a Moment" (Gibbs/Hurley) 3:42
11. "Fade Away" (Gibbs/Hurley) 4:53
12. "Residue" (Gibbs/Hurley) 4:15

Japanese Version (Universal) Catalog Number: MVCF-24056 (1999)

1. "C'mon, C'mon" (Gibbs/Hurley) 2:36
2. "Everyone Can Fly" (Gibbs/Hurley) 4:20
3. "Half a Chance" (Gibbs/Hurley) 2:53
4. "Super Ultra Mega Wicked Love" (Gibbs/Hurley) 4:41
5. "You'd Better Get Yourself Together, Baby" (Gibbs/Hurley) 3:50
6. "Everything Is Wrong" (Gibbs/Hurley/Jane Wiedlin) 3:28
7. "The Big Lie" (Gibbs/Hurley/Dave Bassett) 3:29
8. "Simple Thing" (Gibbs/Hurley) 3:55
9. "Rest Assured" (Gibbs/Hurley) 3:31
10. "For a Moment" (Gibbs/Hurley) 3:42
11. "Fade Away" (Gibbs/Hurley) 4:53
12. "Residue" (Gibbs/Hurley) 4:15
13. "Kinda Girl" (Jules Shear/Gibbs/Hurley) 3:18

== Personnel ==
Gigolo Aunts

- Dave Gibbs – vocals, guitar
- Jon Skibic – guitar, vocals
- Steve Hurley – bass, vocals
- Fred Eltringham – drums, vocals
