= Is Everybody Happy? =

Is Everybody Happy? is a catchphrase of Ted Lewis that was used in the 1928 song, "Wear A Hat With A Silver Lining" by Al Sherman and Albert Bryan. The catchphrase also was the title of two films starring Lewis:

- Is Everybody Happy? (1929 film), an American Pre-Code musical film
- Is Everybody Happy? (1943 film), an American black and white musical film

Is Everybody Happy? may also refer to:

== Music ==
- "Is Everybody Happy?", a song by Gigolo Aunts on the album Everybody Happy
- "Is Everybody Happy?", lyric from "Happy?" by Public Image Ltd on the album 9

== See also ==
- Happy (disambiguation)
