= Heavens (album) =

1987 studio album by Big Dipper

Studio album by Big Dipper
- Released: 1987
- Genre: Alternative rock; indie rock
- Length: 32:05
- Label: Homestead
- Producer: Paul Q. Kolderie

Big Dipper chronology
| Boo-Boo EP (1987) | Heavens (1987) | Craps (1988) |

Professional ratings
Review scores
| Source | Rating |
|---|---|
| NME | 5/10 |

Heavens is the debut studio album from American indie rock band Big Dipper. The album was released in 1987 by Homestead Records. Heavens was remastered and re-released in 2008 as part of Merge Records' Supercluster: The Big Dipper Anthology set. The song "Mr. Woods" was covered by Gigolo Aunts on Safe and Sound: A Benefit in Response to the Brookline Clinic Violence, released in 1996 on Mercury Records.

== Track listing ==
Heavens track listing
| No. | Title | Length |
|---|---|---|
| 1. | "She's Fetching" | 2:37 |
| 2. | "Man O'War" | 2:41 |
| 3. | "Easter Eve" | 3:37 |
| 4. | "Humason" | 2:56 |
| 5. | "Lunar Module" | 4:48 |
| 6. | "All Going Out Together" | 2:57 |
| 7. | "Younger Bums" | 2:57 |
| 8. | "When Men Were Trains" | 2:29 |
| 9. | "Wet Weekend" | 3:15 |
| 10. | "Mr. Woods" | 3:12 |
| 11. | "Guitar Named Desire" (cassette release only) | 1:54 |
