= Down on Me =

Down on Me may refer to:

- "Down on Me" (traditional song), a traditional song from the 1920s that became popular following its remake by Big Brother and the Holding Company
- "Down on Me", a 1980 song by Heart from their album Bébé le Strange, which was re-recorded for their 2016 album Beautiful Broken
- "Down on Me", a 1990 song by Gigolo Aunts from Tales from the Vinegar Side
- "Down on Me", a 1992 song by Jackyl from their eponymous debut album
- "Down on Me" (Jeremih song), 2010
- "Down on Me", a 2014 song by DJ Mustard
- "Down on Me", a 2016 song by Fedde Le Grand
