= Holy Toledo =

Holy Toledo may refer to:

- "Holy Toledo!", a catchphrase of sportscasters Bill King and Milo Hamilton
- "Holy Toledo", a song by Vundabar from Antics
- "Holy Toledo", a song by Gigolo Aunts from Everybody Happy
- "Holy Toledo", a song by Crystal Bowersox from Farmer's Daughter
- "Holy Toledo!", a song by Green Day from Mark, Mary & Some Other People
