= Where I Find My Heaven =

- Cover the 1995 single release

Single by Gigolo Aunts

from the album Flippin' Out
- Released: 1993
- Length: 3:23
- Label: Fire
- Songwriters: Dave Gibbs, Phil Hurley, Steve Hurley, Paul Brouwer
- Producer: Mike Denneen

Gigolo Aunts singles chronology
"Shame" (1993)	"Where I Find My Heaven" (1993)	"Mrs. Washington" (1994)

"Where I Find My Heaven" is a song written and performed by Gigolo Aunts. It was released as a 1993 single by Fire Records in support of the 1993 album Flippin' Out. It was later re-released as an April 1995 single to highlight its inclusion on the soundtrack to the movie, Dumb and Dumber, and its use as the opening music to the British sitcom, Game On. The April 1995 single entered the UK charts on 13 May 1995 at Number 29 and remained on the charts for 3 weeks.

== Track listing ==
UK Single (Fire Records) Catalog Number: blaze63cd (1993) Format: CD single

1. "Where I Find My Heaven" (Brouwer, Gibbs, Hurley, Hurley) 3:25
2. "That's OK" (Brouwer, Gibbs, Hurley, Hurley) 3:58

UK Single (Fire Records) Catalog Number: blaze87cd (1995) Format: 7" single

1. "Where I Find My Heaven" (Brouwer, Gibbs, Hurley, Hurley) 3:28
2. "Ride on Baby Ride On (Acoustic)" (Brouwer, Gibbs, Hurley, Hurley) 5:16

UK Single (Fire Records) Catalog Number: blaze87cd (1995) Format: CD single

1. "Where I Find My Heaven" (Brouwer, Gibbs, Hurley, Hurley) 3:28
2. "Ride on Baby Ride On" (Brouwer, Gibbs, Hurley, Hurley) 5:16
3. "Lemon Peeler" (Brouwer, Gibbs, Hurley, Hurley) 3:28
4. "Serious Drugs" (Stewart, Blake, McAlinden) 3:55

US Promo Single (RCA/BMG) Catalog Number: RDJ 64290-2 (1995) Format: CD single

1. "Where I Find My Heaven" (Brouwer, Gibbs, Hurley, Hurley) 3:23
