= Everyone Can Fly =

EP by Gigolo Aunts
- Released: 1999
- Genre: Rock, Alternative, Power Pop
- Label: E Pluribus Unum (US)
- Producer: Mike Denneen

Gigolo Aunts chronology
Minor Chords and Major Themes (1999)	Everyone Can Fly (1999)	Pacific Ocean Blues (2002)

"Everyone Can Fly" is a song written and performed by Gigolo Aunts and the title song from their 1999 EP, Everyone Can Fly. The song, "Everyone Can Fly" also appears on the 1999 Gigolo Aunts album, Minor Chords and Major Themes. The song is also the featured track on a 1999 promo single. Dave Gibbs, writer of the song, gave inspiration credit for the song to Mark Wohlers.

== Track listing ==
US EP (E Pluribus Unum Recordings) Catalog Number: EPU5P 1032 (1999)

1. "Everyone Can Fly" (Gibbs/Hurley) 4:22
2. "The Shift to Superoverdrive" (Gibbs/Hurley) 3:45
3. "To Whoever" (Gibbs/Hurley) 4:10
4. "Sulk with Me" (Gibbs/Hurley) 4:10
5. "The Big Lie" (Demo) (Gibbs/Hurley/Basset) 3:31
6. "Half a Chance" (Live on KCRW) (Gibbs/Hurley) 2:20

US Promo Single (E Pluribus Unum Recordings) Catalog Number: EPU5P 1030 (15 June 1999)

1. "Everyone Can Fly" (Gibbs/Hurley) 4:20
