= Flippin' Out =

1993 studio album by Gigolo Aunts

Studio album by Gigolo Aunts
- Released: October 1993 (UK); April 12, 1994 (US)
- Genres: Alternative rock; power pop; indie pop
- Labels: Fire Records (UK); RCA/BMG (US)
- Producers: Mike Denneen, Paul Q. Kolderie

Gigolo Aunts chronology
Full-On Bloom (1993)	Flippin' Out (1993)	Learn to Play Guitar (1997)

Professional ratings
Review scores
Source	Rating
AllMusic	4.5/5 stars

Flippin' Out is the third studio album by American rock band Gigolo Aunts released in October 1993 on Fire Records in the UK and April 1994 on RCA/BMG in the US.

It includes the track "Where I Find My Heaven", featured on the soundtrack to 1994 comedy film, Dumb and Dumber, which helped to break the band into the charts. The song "Lemon Peeler" was featured in the 1995 movie Born to Be Wild. The US and UK versions feature different track listings. The title track, "Flippin' Out", was originally recorded by the Wizards, a NY/NJ supergroup circa 1988/1989, part of a six song EP that was never released. In a story attributed to Phil Marino, known for his work photographing the band, the Gigolo Aunts became acquainted with the song through Rob Norris, the producer of their debut album, Everybody Happy. Norris, a former member of the Bongos and at the time a current member of the Wizards, reportedly sent a tape of the six song EP to the Gigolo Aunts, who recorded "Flippin' Out" as the title track for the album. The album cover features Chloë Sevigny.

== Track listing ==
All tracks are written by Gigolo Aunts (Dave Gibbs, Phil Hurley, Steve Hurley, and Paul Brouwer), except where noted.

1993 UK release
No.	Title	Writer(s)	Length
1.	"Cope"		3:49
2.	"Where I Find My Heaven"		3:23
3.	"Lullaby"		5:06
4.	"Easy Reader"		3:55
5.	"Figurine"		5:01
6.	"Mrs. Washington"		4:48
7.	"Bloom"		4:01
8.	"Gun"		4:38
9.	"Pin Cushion"		4:41
10.	"Flippin' Out"	Vincent Casey	6:10

1994 US release
No.	Title	Writer(s)	Length
1.	"Cope"		3:47
2.	"Lemon Peeler"		3:28
3.	"Ride On, Baby, Ride On"		5:15
4.	"Bloom"		4:00
5.	"Figurine"		5:03
6.	"Where I Find My Heaven"		3:23
7.	"Lullaby"		5:07
8.	"Mrs. Washington"		4:46
9.	"Gun"		4:38
10.	"Pin Cushion"		4:43
11.	"Flippin' Out"	Casey	6:10

== Personnel ==
Gigolo Aunts

- Dave Gibbs – vocals, guitar
- Phil Hurley – guitar, vocals
- Steve Hurley – bass, vocals
- Paul Brouwer – drums

Additional

- Mike Denneen – producer, engineer, piano, chamberlin
- Adam Lasus – co-producer
- Paul Q. Kolderie – producer on "Cope" and "Bloom", mix consulting
- Bill Inglot – mastering
- Alex Vangellow – Hammond organ
- Peter Rush – Hammond organ
- Eric Menck – Latin percussion
- Geoffrey Chisholm – design
- Michael Lavine – photography
- Chloë Sevigny – cover model
