= Tom Scharpling =

American comedian, writer, and actor

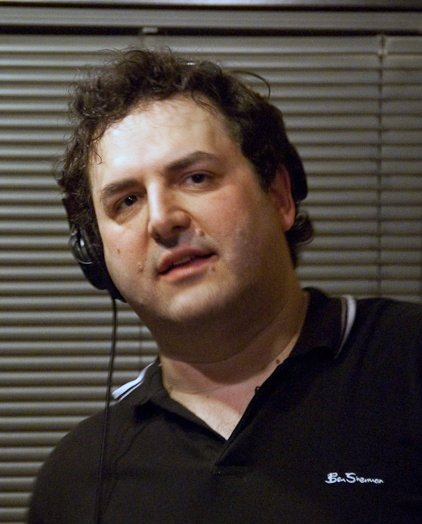
- Tom Scharpling on The Best Show on WFMU in 2009
- Born: Thomas John Giuliano II; February 9, 1969 (age 57); New Jersey, U.S.
- Notable work: The Best Show on WFMU, Monk, Steven Universe, Adventure Time

Comedy career
- Years active: 2000–present
- Medium: Radio, television
- Genres: Comedy radio, surreal humor
- Website: friendsoftom.com

Thomas John Giuliano II (born February 9, 1969), known professionally as Tom Scharpling, is an American comedian, television writer, producer, music video director, voice actor, and radio host. He is best known for hosting the weekly Internet radio call-in comedy program The Best Show with Tom Scharpling (formerly The Best Show on WFMU), the voice of Greg Universe in the animated series Steven Universe and its sequel series Steven Universe Future, and for acting as a writer/executive producer for the TV show Monk.

Scharpling was also a writer on Tom Goes to the Mayor. Beginning in 1999, he released six albums with comedy partner Jon Wurster under the moniker Scharpling & Wurster.

As a writer, Scharpling has had work published in GQ, New York Magazine, and Harp. Since 2010, Scharpling has directed music videos for MGMT, The New Pornographers, Ted Leo, Titus Andronicus, Wild Flag, Aimee Mann, Real Estate, Frankie Cosmos, and The Ettes.

In 2017, Rolling Stone named Scharpling one of the "50 Funniest People Right Now," and in 2019, Vulture named The Best Show one of the "10 Essential Comedy Podcasts That Shaped The Genre."

== Early life ==
Scharpling was born in New Jersey. He grew up in Dunellen, New Jersey. He was a fan of Saturday Night Live and SCTV from a young age. He attended Middlesex High School, Middlesex Community College, and Trenton State College. He graduated with a degree in English. Scharpling worked at a sheet music shop called World of Music in Summit, New Jersey, from 1979 through 1999.

He has cited his major comedy influences as Chris Elliott's Get a Life, SCTV, Saturday Night Live, and the 1994 absurdist comedy Clifford starring Martin Short. Scharpling later purchased the suit worn by Short in Clifford via an eBay auction.

In his late teens, Scharpling had a mental breakdown that led him to be checked in to a mental hospital; his condition was cured with electroconvulsive therapy, which led to some memory loss.

Scharpling became an avid cassette tape collector, and began to use the name "Mel Sharples" (the name of a character on the sitcom Alice) for himself when ordering tapes, to distinguish himself from his father, who had the same name (Scharpling was then still known as Tom Giuliano). He found that he enjoyed having a pseudonym, because the new name had no "baggage", including no association to his previous mental illness. He decided to "tweak" the name Mel Sharples and went with "Tom Scharpling"; the surname was based on a combination of the surnames of activist Al Sharpton and comedian Garry Shandling, with a "c" added in for "panache".

== Career ==
=== Early music-based radio shows and writing ===
In the early 1990s, Scharpling was the publisher of 18 Wheeler fanzine, and ran an independent record label of the same name. The first 7-inch single by Portastatic was released by Scharpling's label in 1992. He also contributed the liner notes for The Electrifying Conclusion, Guided by Voices's DVD documentary of their "final" live show in Chicago released in 2005. He began volunteering at the New Jersey–based freeform station WFMU in the early 1990s.

He started hosting a music-oriented program on the station in the mid-1990s. He briefly left the station in the late 1990s because he "had some personal things to take care of with family and stuff." Scharpling has told interviewers that he prefers the medium of radio due to the anxiety he gets from being onstage.

=== The Best Show with Tom Scharpling ===
==== The Best Show on WFMU ====
Scharpling hosted the first episode of The Best Show on WFMU on October 10, 2000. The program was a three-hour comedy, music, call-in and talk radio program that aired Tuesday nights; the program featured a roster of genuine callers as well as calls in-character from Jon Wurster (with occasional in-character calls from Andrew Earles, H. Jon Benjamin, Jon Glaser, Peyton Reed and others). The show began incorporating more celebrity guests, including regular appearances from Patton Oswalt, Ted Leo, Paul F. Tompkins and other names from film, music and comedy.

Scharpling is considered by some as the "Godfather of Podcasting". Episodes of The Best Show were archived from the shows beginning, as were most of the programs on WFMU, in the RealPlayer format. It began podcasting in early 2006 with the music removed from the latest shows and offered as downloadable files on the internet through the rest of its run on the station, helping it reach an even wider audience than it had already developed. Scharpling made no money from the station, and regularly encouraged fans to donate to the non-profit station by offering elaborate pledge drive gifts.

Citing his tenure on The Best Show on WFMU as proof, the August 2010 issue of GQ magazine listed Scharpling No. 11 on its list of 37 "Never Not Funny" comedians, dubbing him one of "the funniest men you haven't heard of yet."

On October 29, 2013, Scharpling announced that the final Best Show on WFMU was to air on December 17, 2013. On October 10, 2014, 14 years to the day after The Best Show first aired, Scharpling announced via his Twitter page that The Best Show would return in November 2014.

==== The Best Show with Tom Scharpling ====
On December 17, 2014, the first episode of The Best Show in its new format, a web-cast and podcast, aired via thebestshow.net from an independent studio in Jersey City. The live webcast of the show follows a similar format as it did on WFMU, with callers, skits performed by Scharpling & Wurster, and a three-hour run-time.

In 2014, the show spawned an Adult Swim special, titled The Newbridge Tourism Board Presents: We're Newbridge We're Comin' to Get Ya!, featuring Wurster, Julie Klausner and Gilbert Gottfried, as well as many Scharpling & Wurster characters from the show.

The show currently takes place in Los Angeles from the Forever Dog studios in North Hollywood. This new iteration of the show includes a live video stream on YouTube (formerly Twitch), musical performances and two 24-hour episodes.

==== Scharpling & Wurster ====
Nearly every episode of The Best Show features an on-air collaboration with Superchunk drummer Jon Wurster. The pair met at a concert in the early 1990s, and bonded over their mutual love of Chris Elliott's short-lived sitcom Get a Life.

Their partnership began with a call aired on Scharpling's music program titled Rock, Rot & Rule, where Wurster portrayed a snobby rock critic, answering questions from incredulous callers that didn't realize it was an act.

As Scharpling and Wurster, they have released six albums of comedy segments from The Best Show on their Stereolaffs record label. In 2013, they released a live set on Third Man Records.

In 2015, Numero Group released a retrospective box set of their calls from The Best Show on WFMU. That same year, the duo made an appearance on Late Night with Seth Meyers. The pair voiced characters on an episode of The Simpsons in 2016.

=== Television ===
Tom Scharpling was the first writer to be hired for the series Monk. He was hired to the show by Saturday Night Live writer and fellow WFMU DJ Andy Breckman. Scharpling acted as Monk's executive producer during the last four of the show's eight seasons.

He appeared on an episode of Aqua Teen Hunger Force ("The Shaving") as the voice of "Willie Nelson", an awkward, unassertive onion–spider monster hybrid who lives in the attic of the house. He also appears on the special features portion of the Aqua Teen Hunger Force Volume 3 DVD. In addition, Scharpling occasionally wrote for Tom Goes to the Mayor. He voices Greg Universe in the animated series Steven Universe. He also voiced Jermaine in the animated series Adventure Time. Scharpling was a head writer/co-executive producer for season one of HBO's show Divorce.

=== Music videos ===
Starting in August 2010, Scharpling has directed a number of music videos, typically for groups that he is friends with, and mostly on an extremely limited budget. The shorts usually contain a number of celebrity cameos, and are often met with positive reviews.

Scharpling's music video for Ted Leo and the Pharmacists's "Bottled in Cork" shows the band agreeing to star in a Broadway musical, in a spoof of Green Day's musical American Idiot. The video features Paul F. Tompkins as a theater promoter, Julie Klausner as a dance instructor and John Hodgman as a theatre critic. The video obtained "Immortal" status on Funny or Die shortly after it was released online.

With the video for The New Pornographers' "Moves", Scharpling was presented with the issue of the band being on tour, rendering them unable to appear in the short. As a solution, Scharpling chose to create a trailer for a fake biographical film about The New Pornographers, with a number of comedy celebrities portraying the various members of the band. The video features Wyatt Cenac, Horatio Sanz, Gary Dell'Abate, Todd Barry, Julie Klausner, John Hodgman, Bill Hader, Paul Rudd, Donald Glover, John Oliver, and Jon Wurster.

In 2012, Scharpling directed the video for Aimee Mann's song "Labrador", which is a shot-by-shot remake of the video for the 1985 'Til Tuesday song "Voices Carry", with Mann in the lead role, Jon Wurster playing the abusive yuppie boyfriend, and Ted Leo as the guitarist in Mann's band. The video begins with a brief "making of" clip featuring Jon Hamm as "Tom Scharpling", discussing the video concept, and Mann stating that she was tricked into doing the video.

Scharpling has also directed music videos for Titus Andronicus, Wild Flag, The Ettes, Real Estate, The Stepkids, and MGMT.

=== Web ===
Scharpling guest starred as the bailiff in the episode "A Room with a Feud" of John Hodgman's comedy/court show podcast Judge John Hodgman.

=== Print ===
Scharpling is a regular columnist for and co-founder of the sports website The Classical. He has worked as a headline contributor for The Onion, as well as the writer of Harp Magazine's "(Not So) Great Moments in Rock" column. He has also contributed basketball-themed writing to GQ and SLAM Magazine. In 2011, Scharpling was commissioned by New York Magazine to write multi-page recaps for every episode of the fourth season of NBC's Celebrity Apprentice.

On July 6, 2021, Abrams Press released Scharpling's memoir, It Never Ends: A Memoir with Nice Memories!

== Personal life ==
Until 2020, Scharpling lived in Woodbridge Township, New Jersey with his former wife, fellow WFMU DJ Terre T. As of December 2024, he lives in Los Angeles with his wife Julia Vickerman. He has been a pescatarian since approximately 1994, and almost never consumes alcohol.

== Filmography ==
=== As actor ===
Year	Title	Role	Note
1998	Upright Citizens Brigade	Man in Audience	Episode: "Saigon Suicide Show"
2003	Aqua Teen Hunger Force	Willie Nelson (voice)	Episode: "The Shaving"
2013–2019	Steven Universe	Greg Universe / Yellowtail (voice)	Recurring cast
2014	The Newbridge Tourism Board Presents: We're Newbridge, We're Comin' to Get Ya!	Name Redacted	TV special
2015	Ant-Man	Cashier	Scene deleted
2015–2018	Adventure Time	Jermaine (voice)	4 episodes
2016	The Simpsons	Paul (voice)	Episode: "The Marge-ian Chronicles"
2017	Fortnite	Plankerton DJ / Additional voices	Video game
2017	Steven Universe: Save the Light	Greg Universe (voice)	Video game
2018	Ant-Man and the Wasp	Burch's SUV Driver	
2019	Steven Universe: The Movie	Greg Universe (voice)	Television film
2019–2020	Steven Universe Future	Greg Universe (voice)	Recurring cast
2020	The George Lucas Talk Show	Self	Episode: "A New Coping Mechanism", "The Hey Nong Mandalorian"; multiple marathon fundraiser appearances
2022	Steven Universe: Unleash the Light	Greg Universe (voice)	Video game
2022	Tuca & Bertie	Dr. Mole (voice)	Episode: "The Mole"
2023	Ant-Man and the Wasp: Quantumania	N'brij	
2023	Kiff	Rob Sadly (voice)	Episode: "Lost and Found"
2023	I Think You Should Leave with Tim Robinson	Coworker	Episode: "Don't Just Say 'Relax', Actually Relax"

=== As writer ===
Year	Title	Note
2002–2009	Monk	Also executive producer and story editor
2006	Tom Goes to the Mayor	
2016	Divorce	Also co-executive producer
2017	Difficult People	Also consulting producer
2019	What We Do in the Shadows	Also co-executive producer
2021	Kevin Can F*** Himself	Also co-executive producer
2023–2024	Krapopolis	Also co-executive producer

== Discography ==
- Rock, Rot and Rule (Stereolaffs, 1999, re-issue in 2004; Light in the Attic, 2014 [vinyl release])
- Chain Fights, Beer Busts and Service with a Grin (Stereolaffs, 2002)
- New Hope for the Ape-Eared (Stereolaffs, 2004)
- Hippy Justice (Stereolaffs, 2005)
- The Art of the Slap (Stereolaffs, 2007)
- A Vampire or a Dogman (Merge, 2009; from SCORE! Twenty Years Of Merge Records)
- The Best of The Best Show (Numero Group, 2015; retrospective box set)

=== WFMU Marathon Premiums ===
- The Best of the Best of The Best Show on WFMU Vol. 1 (2003)
- The Best of the Best of The Best Show on WFMU Vol. 2 (2005)
- The Best You Can Do Is Be Worse Than The Best Show on WFMU (2007)
- At The Speed Of Sound (2009)
- TOM – A Best Show On WFMU Tribute to Ram (2009)
- Best Show Uncovered Vol. 1 (2010, from the WFMU 24-Hour Emergency Marathon) (MP3 CD)

== DVD ==
- Fantasia in Best Show Minor: The Best Show on WFMU 2010 Marathon DVD (2011)
- John Hodgman: Ragnarok (2013)
