= Pacific Ocean Blues (album) =

Studio album by Gigolo Aunts
- Released: April 8, 2002 (Spain/Japan); February 4, 2003 (US)
- Genres: Alternative rock, power pop
- Labels: Bittersweet (Spain/Japan); Q Division (US)
- Producers: Tracks 1, 4-12: Chris Horvath; Tracks 2, 3, 13: Jon Fields

Gigolo Aunts chronology
Everyone Can Fly (1999)	Pacific Ocean Blues (2002)

Professional ratings
Review scores
Source	Rating
AllMusic	3/5 stars
The Phoenix	3/5 stars

Pacific Ocean Blues is the final album by Gigolo Aunts. It was released in 2002 on Bittersweet Recordings in Spain and Japan, and subsequently released in 2003 in the U.S. on Q Division Records. The track, "Lay Your Weary Body Down (Reprise)" from the US version of the album is not listed on the album cover. Both the Spanish and US versions of the CD are housed in digipaks.

== Track listing ==
Spanish Version (Bittersweet Recordings) Catalog Number: BS-010-CD (2002)

1. "Hello" (Gibbs/Hurley) 1:42
2. "Mr. Tomorrow" (Gibbs/Hurley) 3:13
3. "Even Though (The One Before the Last)" (Gibbs/Hurley) 4:30
4. "Let Go!" (Gibbs/Hurley) 5:11
5. "Pacific Ocean Blues" (Gibbs/Hurley) 2:24
6. "Lay Your Weary Body Down" (Gibbs/Hurley) 4:14
7. "Stay" (Gibbs/Hurley) 3:00
8. "Only You" (Gibbs/Hurley) 2:13
9. "Once in Awhile" (Gibbs/Hurley) 3:22
10. "My Favorite Regret" (Gibbs/Hurley) 3:00
11. "Maybe the Change Will Do Us Good" (Gibbs/Hurley) 6:29

US Version (Q Division Records) Catalog Number: QDIV1021 (2003)

1. "Hello" (Gibbs/Hurley) 1:42
2. "Mr. Tomorrow" (Gibbs/Hurley) 3:13
3. "Even Though (The One Before the Last)" (Gibbs/Hurley) 4:30
4. "Let Go!" (Gibbs/Hurley) 5:11
5. "Pacific Ocean Blues" (Gibbs/Hurley) 2:24
6. "Lay Your Weary Body Down" (Gibbs/Hurley) 4:14
7. "Stay" (Gibbs/Hurley) 3:00
8. "Only You" (Gibbs/Hurley) 2:13
9. "Once in Awhile" (Gibbs/Hurley) 3:22
10. "My Favorite Regret" (Gibbs/Hurley) 3:00
11. "Maybe the Change Will Do Us Good" (Gibbs/Hurley) 6:29
12. "Lay Your Weary Body Down (Reprise)" (Gibbs Hurley) 1:47
13. "Long Scattered Daydream" (Gibbs/Hurley) 4:00

== Personnel ==
Gigolo Aunts

- Dave Gibbs – vocals, guitar
- Jon Skibic – guitar, vocals
- Steve Hurley – bass, vocals
- Fred Eltringham – drums, vocals
