= Whip It (soundtrack) =

Whip It (Music from the Motion Picture)

Soundtrack album by various artists
- Released: September 29, 2009
- Recorded: 2009
- Genre: Pop; rock; EDM; dance-pop; indie pop
- Length: 58:31
- Label: Rhino Entertainment
- Producer: Brent Kyle; Randall Poster; Drew Barrymore
- Compiler: Randall Poster

Whip It (Music from the Motion Picture) is the soundtrack album to the 2009 film Whip It directed by Drew Barrymore starring Elliot Page. It was released on September 29, 2009 under the Rhino Entertainment label and featured 19 songs ranging from pop, rock and EDM. The album was compiled by music supervisor Randall Poster.

== Background ==
While the film featured around 75 songs, only 19 of them appear in the soundtrack. Barrymore noted that music played an integral role in the script, where the team assembled a playlist that was frequently played on set and spent countless hours listening to as many different songs as possible in order to search the right songs for the right moment. She noted that some of the songs were inspirational for the team very early in the process and had set the tone of the film as well.

The soundtrack featured contributions from an array of musicians and bands such as Goose, The Go! Team, the Ettes, Jens Lekman, Apollo Sunshine, Peaches, Tilly and the Wall, Dolly Parton, the Raveonettes. Landon Pigg who appears in the film also contributed few songs to the soundtrack. Randall Poster served as the film's music supervisor. Even though he felt the music "didn’t feel overworked or overburdened" the maximum number of tunes that included in the film, where unexpected, even though his previous works Jennifer's Body and Up in the Air did not have this amount of music. He felt the film had potential for lot of music, but everything laid naturally into the story without feeling contrived.

The Section Quartet band which composed the film score, had also covered some of the songs by Radiohead, Muse, Soundgarden, the Postal Service. However, neither of their score nor their covers appear in the film's soundtrack.

== Release ==
The soundtrack was released through Rhino Entertainment on September 29, 2009, in both digital ($11.99) and physical ($13.99) formats. It was later issued in a special collectible LP records.

== Reception ==
Mike Driver of BBC wrote, "An hour of great music that works independently of its parent picture." Margaret Reges of AllMusic wrote "Stumbles like this make Whip It a mixed bag of a mixtape—as far as soundtracks go, though, it's every bit as harmless and feel-good as the movie that inspired it." Reviewer based at Page Six wrote "The entire Whip It soundtrack plays out like you’re living inside Rainbow Brite’s socks, each layer brighter and more colorful than the last." Rob Nelson of Variety noted the soundtrack "matches the fast-rolling action hit for hit".

== Track listing ==
No.	Title	Artist(s)	Length
1.	"Pot Kettle Black"	Tilly and the Wall	2:49
2.	"Sheena Is a Punk Rocker"	Ramones	2:46
3.	"What's the Altitude"	Cut Chemist featuring Hymnal	4:05
4.	"Bang On"	The Breeders	2:00
5.	"Dead Sound"	The Raveonettes	3:35
6.	"Blue Turning Grey"	Clap Your Hands Say Yeah	1:15
7.	"Your Arms Around Me"	Jens Lekman	5:01
8.	"Learnalilgivinanlovin"	Gotye	2:47
9.	"Boys Wanna Be Her"	Peaches	3:54
10.	"Jolene"	Dolly Parton	2:40
11.	"Caught Up in You"	38 Special	4:35
12.	"Never My Love"	Har Mar Superstar featuring Adam Green	3:04
13.	"Black Gloves"	Goose	2:34
14.	"Crown of Age"	The Ettes	2:15
15.	"High Times"	Landon Pigg featuring Turbo Fruits	4:53
16.	"Unattainable"	Little Joy	2:00
17.	"Lollipop (Squeak E. Clean & Desert Eagles remix)"	The Chordettes	2:05
18.	"Doing it Right"	The Go! Team	3:24
19.	"Breeze"	Apollo Sunshine	2:50
Total length:			58:31

Whip It (Original Motion Picture Soundtrack) — Amazon edition
No.	Title	Artist(s)	Length
20.	"Fun Dream Love Dream"	Turbo Fruits	4:00
Total length:			62:31

Whip It (Original Motion Picture Soundtrack) — iTunes edition
No.	Title	Artist(s)	Length
21.	"Know How (iTunes version bonus track)"	Young MC	4:01
22.	"The Road to Austin (iTunes version bonus track)"	The Section Quartet	1:56
Total length:			64:28

== Chart performance ==
Chart (2009)	Peak position
UK Soundtrack Albums (OCC)	35
US Billboard 200	113
US Top Soundtracks (Billboard)	14
