= Stonehoney =

- Also known as: Songs from the Hillside Living Room
- Origin: Los Angeles, CA
- Genres: Country rock, Southern rock
- Years active: 2007-present
- Label: Music Road Records
- Members: Shawn Davis; Phil Hurley; Dave Phenicie; Nick Randolph
- Website: Official website

Stonehoney is an American rock band from Austin, Texas. Stonehoney consists of Shawn Davis on vocals and electric guitar, Phil Hurley on vocals and lead electric guitar, Dave Phenicie on vocals and bass guitar, and Nick Randolph (Brother of actor Christopher Randolph) on vocals and acoustic guitar. Stonehoney has been touring extensively since 2007 and has released one album, The Cedar Creek Sessions.

== History ==
The quartet first began playing together in Randolph's living room in Los Angeles, under the name "Songs from the Hillside Living Room", although soon they were performing in a variety of settings around Los Angeles. They changed the name to Stonehoney and committed to the band full-time, eventually moving to Austin in search of expanded performing opportunities.

The band thrived in Austin, where audiences cared more about the actual music than the glamorous presentation of the musicians. As Hurley put it, "People weren’t interested in whether we were hunky; they just wanted to know if we could play and if our songs were any good. It felt like we’d come home."

== The Cedar Creek Sessions ==
Stonehoney released their first album entitled The Cedar Creek sessions with Music Road Records in 2010. The band spent four days recording forty compositions all in live takes. Fourteen of those forty songs made the final cut for the album. Some of singles from the album include "Two Years Down", "I Don't Want to Go Home", and "Good as Gone".
