= The One Before the Last =

Compilation album by Gigolo Aunts
- Released: 2000
- Genres: Rock, alternative, power pop
- Label: Bittersweet (Spain)
- Producers: Ricardo del Castillo (Track 1); Gigolo Aunts (Tracks 3–10); Barron Burke (Tracks 2, 4, 5, 6, 7, 8, 9, 11); Brian Charles (Tracks 3, 10); Charlton Pettus (Track 12)

The One Before the Last is a 2000 album by Gigolo Aunts. It is a collection of rare and unreleased material on the Spanish Bittersweet Recordings label. The album includes the single, "The Girl from Yesterday", a cover of Nacha Pop's "Chica de Ayer" from their 1980 album, Nacha Pop.

== Track listing ==
Spanish Version (Bittersweet Recordings) Catalog Number: BS-002-CD (2000)

1. "The Girl from Yesterday" (Antonio Vega) 3:44
2. "Kay and Michael" (Gibbs/Hurley) 2:18
3. "The Shift to Superoverdrive" (Gibbs/Hurley) 3:44
4. "To Whoever" (Gibbs/Hurley) 4:10
5. "Sulk with Me" (Gibbs/Hurley) 4:10
6. "Hey Lucky" (Gibbs/Hurley) 3:07
7. "Kinda Girl" (Jules Shear/Gibbs/Hurley) 3:17
8. "Wishing You the Worst" (Gibbs/Hurley) 2:53
9. "Sway" (Gibbs/Hurley) 4:35
10. "Sloe" (Gibbs/Hurley) 3:25
11. "Rocking Chair" (Gibbs/Hurley) 3:42
12. "The Sun Will Rise Again" (Gibbs/Hurley) 3:17
