= Scharpling & Wurster =

Comedy duo

Scharpling and Wurster are a long-form radio comedy duo composed of Tom Scharpling and Jon Wurster. Scharpling was a writer/producer for the USA network program Monk. Wurster spent thirty-one years as the drummer for indie rock pioneers Superchunk, and has also drummed for The Ascended Masters and Guided by Voices vocalist Robert Pollard's solo touring band. He is currently the drummer for The Mountain Goats and Bob Mould.

Scharpling is the host of the long-running radio program The Best Show, which was originally broadcast on WFMU from 2000 to 2013 and has since begun broadcasting independently over the internet as of 2014, airing for three hours on Tuesday nights and released as a podcast the following day. Wurster's calls, which include a variety of characters who typically call from the fictional town of Newbridge, New Jersey (e.g. Timmy von Trimble, a two-inch tall racist, Corey Harris of the band Mother 13) or elsewhere (e.g. The Gorch, an elderly hoodlum who claims he was the basis for Fonzie, Philly Boy Roy, an enthusiast of all things Philly), are the main feature of the show.

Scharpling and Wurster released a series of "Best of the Best Show" CDs on Stereolaffs Records, a label they founded in 1999, between 2002 and 2007. A retrospective, 16 disc box set, The Best of The Best Show, was released by The Numero Group in 2015.

Scharpling and Wurster contributed to several episodes of the 2006 season of the Cartoon Network program Tom Goes to the Mayor. The duo also co-authored the "(Not So) Great Moments in Rock" for Harp Magazine.

In 2016, the duo guest-starred in Simpsons episode "The Marge-ian Chronicles," playing Paul and Barry, scientists leading a privately funded mission to Mars.

== Discography (with Scharpling and Wurster) ==
- Rock, Rot and Rule (Stereolaffs, 1999)
- Chain Fights, Beer Busts and Service with a Grin (Stereolaffs, 2002)
- New Hope for the Ape-Eared (Stereolaffs, 2004)
- Hippy Justice (Stereolaffs, 2005)
- The Art of the Slap (Stereolaffs, 2007) press bio
- The Best of The Best Show (Numero Group, 2015)
- Scharpling & Wurster: Live at Third Man Records (Third Man Records, 2016)
