= Shake the Dust =

Studio album by The Ettes
- Released: September 12, 2006
- Recorded: Toe Rag Studios, London, UK
- Genre: Rock, alternative, garage rock
- Length: 34:02
- Label: Sympathy for the Record Industry
- Producer: Liam Watson

The Ettes chronology
Shake the Dust (2006)	Look At Life Again Soon (2008)

Shake the Dust is the debut studio album by the rock band The Ettes. The album was released on September 12, 2006.

== Track listing ==
No.	Title	Length
1.	"Reputation"	2:11
2.	"Dead and Gone"	2:22
3.	"Alley Cat"	2:37
4.	"Spend My Money"	3:00
5.	"All Right"	2:16
6.	"No More Surprises"	2:08
7.	"We Repel Each Other"	2:33
8.	"It Ain't You"	2:23
9.	"Gimme"	2:20
10.	"Dirty"	2:04
11.	"Soft Focus"	2:05
12.	"Ghosts"	2:37
13.	"Beggars"	2:42
14.	"I Wanna Go Home"	2:43
