= Slam (Big Dipper album) =

Studio album by Big Dipper
- Released: 1990
- Genre: Alternative rock, indie rock
- Label: Epic
- Producer: Steve Haigler, Big Dipper

Big Dipper chronology
Craps (1988)	Slam (1990)	Supercluster: The Big Dipper Anthology (2008)

Slam is the third studio album by the Boston indie rock band Big Dipper. The album was released in 1990 on Epic Records, making it the group's major-label debut. The band supported the album with a North American tour. They were dropped from the label a year later.

== Production ==
Recorded in North Carolina, the album was coproduced by Steve Haigler. Many of its songs are about the music business. The band used samples, horns, and synthesizers on some of the songs.

== Critical reception ==
Professional ratings
Review scores
Source	Rating
AllMusic	2.5/5 stars
The Republican	3/5 stars
The Village Voice	C+

The Boston Globe wrote that "the band in fine form, still writing terse, insanely catchy, oft sly and oblique pop songs." The Republican noted that the album "contains some sparkling melodies, solid lyrics and interesting, guitar-based arrangements." The Washington Times opined that "the musicians construct uncompromisingly tuneful pop-rock tunes while disassembling lyrical conventions."

== Track listing ==
No.	Title	Length
1.	"Love Barge"	3:36
2.	"The Bond"	2:14
3.	"Another Life"	2:08
4.	"Slam"	2:53
5.	"Bony Knees of Nothing"	3:32
6.	"Baby Blue"	3:45
7.	"Picnic"	2:26
8.	"The Monsters of Jazz"	2:43
9.	"Impossible Things"	3:01
10.	"Blood Pact"	2:13
11.	"Father's Day"	2:38
12.	"Baby Doll"	3:55
13.	"A Life Inside the Cemetery"	4:09
14.	"All the Way from Memphis" (Originally recorded by Mott the Hoople)	3:28
