= Craps (album) =

Studio album by Big Dipper
- Released: 1988
- Genres: Post-punk, pop
- Length: 36:15
- Label: Homestead

Big Dipper chronology
Heavens (1987)	Craps (1988)	Slam (1990)

Craps is the second studio album by the Boston band Big Dipper. It was released in 1988 on Homestead Records. The band supported the album with an East Coast tour. The band considered it to be a pop album.

Craps was remastered and re-released in 2008 as part of Merge Records' Supercluster: The Big Dipper Anthology set.

== Critical reception ==
The Boston Globe noted the "winsome, off-center melodies, post-punk framework; off-beat lyrics; hooks galore." The Philadelphia Inquirer praised the "melodic songs, pummeling backbeats, and a surprising amount of finesse." The Daily Breeze wrote that "the songs all have intelligent lyrics supported by fiery musicianship."

== Track listing ==
No.	Title	Length
1.	"Meet the Witch"	3:55
2.	"Ron Klaus Wrecked His House"	5:05
3.	"The Insane Girl"	3:39
4.	"Semjase"	4:37
5.	"Stardom Because"	4:00
6.	"Bonnie"	3:46
7.	"Hey! Mr. Lincoln"	3:35
8.	"The Bells of Love"	3:15
9.	"A Song to Be Beautiful"	4:06
