= The South Austin Moonlighters =

American musical band

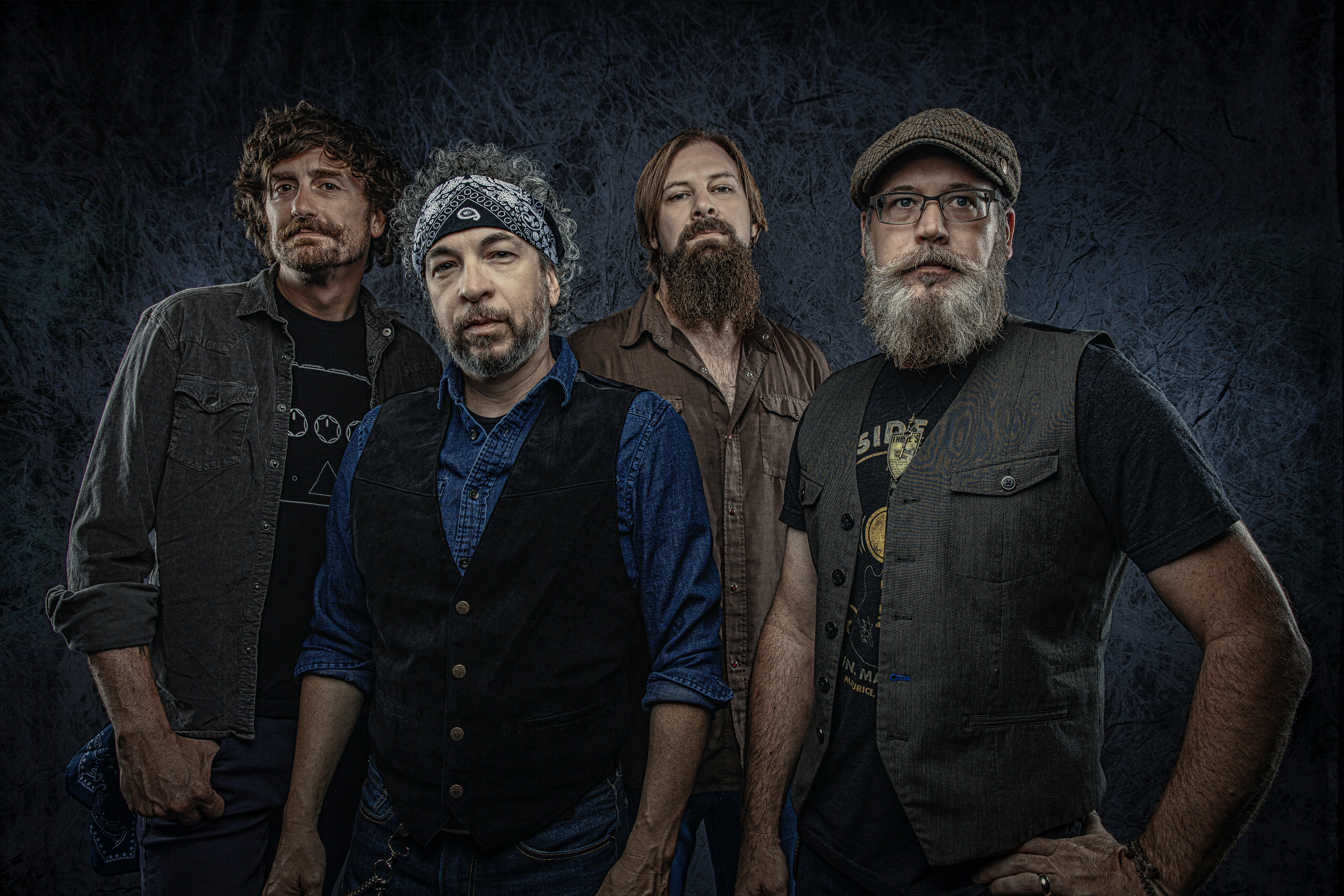
- The South Austin Moonlighters in 2021

Background information
- Origin: Austin, Texas, U.S.
- Genres: Americana; roots music
- Years active: 2011–present
- Members: Lonnie Trevino Jr. (bass, lead vocals); Chris Beall (lead guitar, lead vocals); Daniel James (drums, backing vocals); Hunter St. Marie (lead guitar, backing vocals)
- Past members: Phil Hurley (guitar, lead vocals); Josh Zee (guitar, lead vocals); Steven Collins (guitar, lead vocals); Aaron Beavers (guitar, lead vocals); Phil Bass (drums, lead vocals); Nick Randolph (guitar, backing vocals)
- Website: thesouthaustinmoonlighters.com

The South Austin Moonlighters is an American Americana band from Austin, Texas. Their album Travel Light charted at #1 on the Alternative-Country charts in 2019, with the single "Machine Gun Kelly" charting at #11 on the Top Alternative Country Song Chart of 2019. They have performed at SXSW and the Dallas International Guitar Music Festival, and have shared the stage with artists including Gin Blossoms, Cory Morrow, Eric Gales, and Sonny Landreth.

== Music career ==
In 2011, the South Austin Moonlighters was founded by Aaron Beavers, Phil Hurley, Josh Zee, Steven Collins and singer/songwriter/bass player Lonnie Trevino Jr. (Fastball, Monte Montgomery, and Mike Zito) in Austin, Texas. The original band members began performing a weekday residency at the Saxon Pub in Austin as a "moonlighting" band as they were all in playing in different bands at the time. Soon afterward they became an established band.

Travel Light, released in 2019, charted at #1 on the Alternative-Country charts. On the Top Alternative Country Song Chart for the Year of 2019, singles "Machine Gun Kelly" charted at #11, "Feels Like Home" at #24, and "Nowhere Left to Run" at #25. Travel Light's music video was premiered in an article on Cowboys & Indians.

The band has performed live on numerous video streaming radio stations including Texas Red Dirt Roads Radio and Austin City Limits Radio.

- Discography
- 2023 - From Here to Home

In 2023 the band released the 10-track album From Here to Home, produced by Steve Berlin from the band Los Lobos.

The album received favorable reviews and charted in the Top 100 Albums of 2023 on the Alternative Country Chart. Paul Russell of Americana UK wrote, "There isn't a dud track on this album and it's testament to the quality of the songwriting and production, as well as the sheer classy musicianship of the band, that this is as good an album as it is".

- 2019 - Travel Light

In 2019 the band released Travel Light, produced by Anders Osborne. Osbourne suggested that the band record the album at a destination recording studio as they would not have any outside distractions. In an interview with Ditty TV, Trevino Jr. said, "We are always most proud of the last piece of art you accomplish, right? That being said, I really do believe this album is more focused than any other album we've produced in the past. Our producer, Anders Osborne, made sure of that. In the past, we would record a record with many genres, moods, and/or vibes in mind; just like the bands and records we grew up with. We all write and sing, so in past albums we were all over the map, like say The Beatles' White Album or The Kinks' The Kinks Are the Village Green Preservation Society."

- 2016 - Ghost of a Small Town

Ghost of a Small Town was recorded at Chris Beall's (lead guitar/lead vocals) at-home studio, and was self-produced by the band. "Initially we were thinking of just using my studio a few times to get some ideas down, but it all started sounding really good so we just kept coming back and putting down more songs", said Beall. The album was released on Waterloo Records, garnering radio airplay and a European distribution deal.

- 2014 - Burn & Shine

Burn & Shine was the band's debut album, recorded in 2013. During SXSW 2012, record labels from Europe were interested in seeing the South Austin Moonlighters perform, which resulted in the band signing with German record label Blue Rose Records and releasing Burn & Shine in 2014 in Europe and Scandinavia. "Outstanding, effortlessly organic music that oozes with joy, soul and groove", said the Austin Observer.

- 2012 - Live at the Saxon Pub
