= Learn to Play Guitar =

EP by Gigolo Aunts
- Released: February 25, 1997
- Genres: Alternative rock, power pop
- Label: Wicked Disc (US)
- Producers: Gigolo Aunts (Tracks 1–5), Darron Burke (Tracks 1,2,4,5), Brian Charles (Track 3), Charlton Pettus (Track 6)

Gigolo Aunts chronology
Flippin' Out (1993)	Learn to Play Guitar (1997)	Minor Chords and Major Themes (1999)

Learn to Play Guitar is a 1997 EP by Gigolo Aunts. It includes the track "Kinda Girl", co-written by Jules Shear. The album cover features Anna Lucas.

== Track listing ==
US Version (Wicked Disc) Catalog Number: WIC 1007-2 (1997)

1. "Kinda Girl" (Jules Shear/Gibbs/Hurley) 3:18
2. "Wishing You the Worst" (Gibbs/Hurley) 2:52
3. "Sway" (Gibbs/Hurley) 4:38
4. "Sloe" (Gibbs/Hurley) 3:26
5. "Rocking Chair" (Gibbs/Hurley) 3:39
6. "The Sun Will Rise Again" (Gibbs/Hurley) 3:26
