= Neal Pollack =

American journalist and novelist

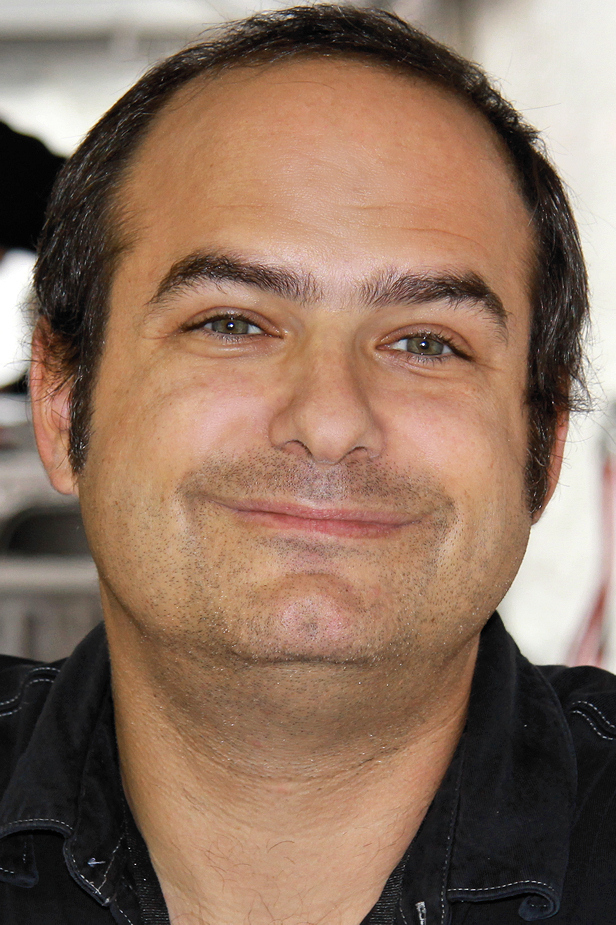
- Neal Pollack at the 2013 Texas Book Festival
- Born: March 1, 1970 (age 56)
- Education: Northwestern University
- Occupation: Journalist
- Writing career
- Genres: novelist; satirist

Neal Pollack (born March 1, 1970) is an American satirist, novelist, short story writer, and journalist. He lives in Austin, Texas. Pollack has written 10 books: The Neal Pollack Anthology of American Literature, Never Mind the Pollacks, Beneath the Axis of Evil, Alternadad, Stretch, Jewball, Downward-Facing Death, Open Your Heart, Repeat, and Keep Mars Weird. He is also a three-time Jeopardy! champion.

== Career ==
After graduating from Northwestern University's Medill School of Journalism, Pollack worked as a staff reporter for the Chicago Reader from 1993 to 2000, covering Chicago city politics and writing profiles of urban eccentrics. Meanwhile, he performed with various improv comedy troupes around Chicago, including ImprovOlympic (where he studied with Del Close) and the Free Associates. After Dave Eggers's magazine McSweeney's began publishing his work, Pollack began appearing in shows with Eggers, John Hodgman, Sarah Vowell, Zadie Smith, David Byrne, Arthur Bradford, James Flint, They Might Be Giants, M. Doughty, and many others before parting ways with McSweeney's in 2003.

Pollack wrote a political satire column for Vanity Fair, and the "Bad Sex With Neal Pollack" column for Nerve.com. His freelance journalism has appeared in The New York Times Magazine, The Wall Street Journal, Esquire, Men's Journal, GQ, Slate, Salon, and many other publications. One of his Slate.com articles was featured in the Best American Sportswriting collection of 2006. His satirical online takedown of James Frey was named one of the "Top 26 Cultural Moments of the Decade" by Slate cultural critic Troy Patterson.

In 2007, Pollack started Offsprung.com, a humor magazine and web community for parents. He writes features about technology for the American and British editions of Wired as well as Popular Mechanics, and contributes frequent car reviews and auto-culture features to the Autos page of Yahoo.com. He also writes features about marijuana culture for The Cannabist, published by The Denver Post, and regularly writes articles about yoga.

In June 2010, Pollack completed a 200-hour yoga teacher's certification course at Richard Freeman's Yoga Workshop in Boulder, Colorado, and he teaches yoga at conferences and studios around the country.

In September 2013, Pollack appeared on the quiz show Jeopardy!, winning more than $62,000 in his four-game run.

== Books and other media ==
The Neal Pollack Anthology of American Literature, a collection of short satires of literary pomposity, was originally published by McSweeney's in 2000. It won the 2001 Firecracker Alternative Book Award for best independently published fiction and led to Pollack being named a "Hot Writer" by Rolling Stone. HarperCollins later published an expanded edition.

In 2001, to coincide with the publication of the paperback edition of his Anthology, Pollack recorded a spoken-word album on Bloodshot Records, produced by Jon Langford and featuring Sally Timms and Kelly Hogan. Designed to look like Harry Smith's Anthology of American Folk Music, the album is a bizarre if entertaining mishmash of styles. HarperCollins put the album out in 2002 as part of a boxed set of Pollack's "collected recordings," including an hour-long disc of Def Poetry Jam parodies and a fake interview with John Hodgman.

Beneath the Axis of Evil, a parody of post-9-11 war punditry, was published in a limited edition by So New Media in 2002. Never Mind The Pollacks, a satirical novel about dueling rock critics, came out from HarperCollins in 2003.

Alternadad, published by Pantheon in January 2007, first exposed Pollack's work to a wider public. Unlike his previous arch satires, Alternadad is a straightforward, if humorous memoir of his early days as a "cool" parent in Austin, Texas. Upon publication, Alternadad received a flurry of press, largely in the form of trend stories about "hipster parents." It was featured in Time and The New York Times, earned Pollack a cover profile in Poets & Writers, and led to a filmed feature about Pollack's family on Nightline. Critics were sharply divided, calling it everything from "the most offbeat parenting memoir ever written" to "indescribably dull."

Stretch: The Unlikely Making of a Yoga Dude, a chronicle of Pollack's adventures in American yoga culture, appeared in August 2010 to largely positive reviews. Wrote Ann Pizer in About.com: "Those yogis who are not naturally athletic, were never a member of a professional dance troupe, and were not raised in a yurt, in other words, ordinary yogis, have found our spokesmodel." Pollack continues to practice and write about yoga, and occasionally teaches yoga classes and workshops around the U.S.

Pollack then made a surprising pivot to self-publishing, releasing his novel Jewball, in October 2011. A marked departure from his previous work, Pollack wrote Jewball, a serio-comic noir set in the world of 1930s Jewish basketball players, as a tribute to the days of classic American crime fiction. Forbes said of Jewball, "Pollack's book reflects the acumen of an accomplished storyteller." Thomas & Mercer released a new edition of Jewball in March 2012, and it quickly climbed the Amazon bestseller list.

In September 2012, Amazon's Thomas & Mercer mystery and thriller imprint published Pollack's novel, Downward-Facing Death as part of its new Kindle Serials program. This "yoga mystery" features a former LAPD detective-turned yoga teacher named Matt Bolster, who solves crimes on the side to pay the rent. Downward-Facing Death was published as a full book in January 2013. Amazon published a second serialized Matt Bolster mystery, Open Your Heart, in the summer of 2013.

Pollack's novel, Repeat, a romantic comedy with a time-travel element, was published by Amazon's Lake Union Press in March 2015.

Pollack is also the editor of Chicago Noir, a collection of original crime stories from Akashic Books. His crime fiction has appeared in numerous magazines and short-story collections.

He formed a punk-rock band in 2003 to publicize Never Mind the Pollacks. The original Neal Pollack Invasion included folk-rock musician Jim Roll, veteran touring musicians Neil Cleary and Jon Williams, and Dakota Smith, a young Austin musician who later became the lead guitarist for Peel. They recorded an album of original songs. Pollack wrote the lyrics and Smith and Roll wrote the music.

Telegraph Records released the album in the fall of 2003, and the band went on a 20-city tour, including shows at the South by Southwest and CMJ. They played their last show in New York City, at the Virgin Megastore in Union Square. Three weeks later, Telegraph Records went bankrupt. In 2013, Chicken Ranch Records, an independent punk label, re-released the album, including a new "bonus track" called "Beer and Weed," as a digital album and limited-edition vinyl.

== Bibliography ==
=== Nonfiction ===
- Pollack, Neal (2007). Alternadad.
- Stretch (2010) ISBN 0-06-172769-5

=== Fiction ===
- The Neal Pollack Anthology of American Literature (2002) ISBN 0-06-001168-8
- Beneath the Axis of Evil, One Man's Journey Into the Horrors of War (2003) ISBN 0-9727636-0-0
- Never Mind the Pollacks: A Rock and Roll Novel (2003) ISBN 0-06-052790-0
- Jewball (2011) ISBN 1612187234
- Downward-Facing Death (2013) ISBN 1612187056
- Open Your Heart (2013) ISBN 1477848444
- Repeat (2015) ISBN 1477821333
- Keep Mars Weird (2015) ISBN 1503951472
- Pothead: My Life as a Marijuana Addict in the Age of Legal Weed (2020)
- Edge of Safety: A Future Tale of Arbitrary Lockdowns and the Deeply Caring Citizens Who Love Them (2022) ISBN 9781637585993
