= Tales from the Vinegar Side =

Studio album by Gigolo Aunts
- Released: 1990
- Genres: Alternative Rock, power pop
- Label: Imposible Records (Spain)
- Producer: Paul Q. Kolderie

Gigolo Aunts chronology
Everybody Happy (1988)	Tales from the Vinegar Side (1990)	Full-On Bloom (1993)

Tales from the Vinegar Side is the 1990 second album by Gigolo Aunts, released on Imposible Records in Spain. The record contains a cover of the Chris Bell composition "I Am the Cosmos" and the song "Down on Me", a modest Boston radio hit. This release was the first of several for the band in Spain, where they are very popular, including a split single with the Posies of "I Am the Cosmos" in 1992 on Munster Records.

== Track listing ==
Spanish Version (Imposible Records) Catalog Number: IMP-020 (1990), Format: LP

1. "I Am the Cosmos" (Chris Bell) 3:09
2. "Down on Me" (Gigolo Aunts) 3:40
3. "It Takes a Little Bit of Time" (Gigolo Aunts) 3:46
4. "Bako Jr." (Gigolo Aunts) 4:41
5. "Nervousness" (Gigolo Aunts) 3:12
6. "The Vinegar Side" (Gigolo Aunts) 3:12
7. "Come Down #4" (Gigolo Aunts) 3:22
8. "That Just Goes to Show Ya" (Gigolo Aunts) 4:14
9. "Pretty" (Gigolo Aunts) 2:42
10. "Perspire" (Gigolo Aunts) 2:29
11. "Home of the Brave" (Gigolo Aunts) 4:28
