= Full-On Bloom =

1993 EP by Gigolo Aunts

EP by Gigolo Aunts
- Released: July 26, 1993
- Genres: Alternative rock, power pop
- Labels: Alias (US), Fire Records (UK)
- Producers: Mike Denneen, Paul Q. Kolderie

Gigolo Aunts chronology
Tales from the Vinegar Side (1990)	Full-On Bloom (1993)	Flippin' Out (1993)

Full-On Bloom is an EP released in July 1993 by Gigolo Aunts. The EP includes a cover of "Serious Drugs", a 1992 single by BMX Bandits later included on their 1993 album, Life Goes On. The album cover features Chloë Sevigny. The photo appears to be from the same session as the photo on the cover of the "Mrs. Washington" single.

== Track listing ==
US Version (Alias Records) Catalog Number: A-051 (1993),
UK Version (Fire Records) Catalog Number: FIRE MCD33 (1993)

1. "Bloom" (Gigolo Aunts) 4:01
2. "Serious Drugs" (Duglas T. Stewart, Norman Blake, Joe McAlinden) 3:56
3. "That's O.K." (Gigolo Aunts) 3:59
4. "Little Carl" (Gigolo Aunts) 1:55
5. "Walk Among Us" (Gigolo Aunts) 4:21
6. "Take Me On" (Gigolo Aunts) 2:33
