= The Ettes =

US musical group

- Origin: Los Angeles, California, U.S.
- Genres: Garage rock revival, blues rock, indie rock
- Years active: 2002–present
- Labels: Rancho de la Luna Records, Krian Music Group, Fond Object Records, Sympathy for the Record Industry, Limited Fanfare Records, Ingrooves
- Members: Lindsay "Coco" Hames; Maria "Poni" Silver
- Past members: Marissa "Max B." Somberg; Terra Cloyes; Amanda Valentine; Johnny "Shoulders" Cauffiel; Jeremy "Jem" Cohen
- Website: www.theettes.com, www.krianmusicgroup.com, www.fondobjectrecords.com

The Ettes is a garage rock revival band founded by Lindsay "Coco" Hames and Maria "Poni" Silver. The band formed in 2003 in Los Angeles, California and is currently based in Nashville, Tennessee.

== History ==
The Ettes released their first album Shake the Dust on Sympathy For The Record Industry in the United States and 2Fer Records in Spain in 2006. Shake The Dust was produced/mixed by Liam Watson and recorded at Toe Rag Studios in London, UK.

The Ettes' second album Look At Life Again Soon released by Take Root Records in the USA, 2Fer Records in Spain and KNTRST in Germany, Austria, and Switzerland in 2008. Look At Life Again Soon was also produced and mixed by Liam Watson and recorded at Toe Rag Studios in London. This release has been called "as good as modern garage rock gets" by Tim Sendra of Allmusic.

The Danger Is EP released by Take Root Records in the USA in April 2009. The EP includes 2 tracks that are produced/mixed by Dan Auerbach and recorded at his Akron Analog studio in Akron, Ohio in December 2009.

The Ettes’ third album Do You Want Power released by Take Root Records in the USA in Sept 2009. The album was also released on Moor Works in Japan, The Planet Company in Australia/New Zealand and KNTRST in Germany, Austria & Switzerland. Do You Want Power was produced/mixed by Greg Cartwright and recorded at the Bomb Shelter in Nashville, Tennessee. Tim Sendra of Allmusic refers to it as "their most focused and diverse set to date and widens their garage rock sound without diluting it".

The Ettes' fourth album Wicked Will was produced at Toe Rag Studios by Liam Watson and released August 2, 2011 through Krian Music and the band's own imprint, Fond Object Records, which was also the name of their record store in East Nashville. The vinyl version was released through Sympathy For The Record Industry.

The Ettes have supported sold-out tours by The Black Keys (2008), Kings Of Leon (2009) and The Dead Weather (2010). The Ettes have also shared the stage with the Silversun Pickups, The New York Dolls, The Go-Go's, The Greenhornes, Jay Reatard, Metric and Gossip. The Ettes performed live on Late Night with Jimmy Fallon in October 2009.

Along with performing in The Ettes, Lindsay "Coco" Hames founded The Parting Gifts with Greg Cartwright. The band's debut album "Strychnine Dandelion" was released November 9, 2010 on In The Red Records and features Patrick Keeler (The Raconteurs, The Greenhornes), Dave Amels (Reigning Sound, Daptones) and a guest appearance from Dan Auerbach (The Black Keys).

== Use in Media ==
- The song "Crown Of Age" from Look at Life Again Soon is featured on Drew Barrymore’s movie Whip It and soundtrack in 2009.
- "Crown Of Age" is also featured in the Patton Oswalt stand up special "Tragedy Plus Comedy Equals Time" (2014).
- In addition, "Crown of Age" is featured in the US TV series The Good Wife, in episode 6x15.
- "Take It With You" is featured in UK TV series Skins, in series 4 finale.
- "Eat the Night" is featured in the 2017 film Columbus.
- "Can't Do That To Me" is featured in the TV series Sons of Tucson (2010)

== Discography ==
=== Albums ===
- Eat the Night (Demo album - 2005)
- Shake the Dust (2006)
- Look at Life Again Soon (2008)
- Do You Want Power (2009)
- Wicked Will (2011)
- Shake the Dust (10th Anniversary Edition) (2006/2016)

=== EP's ===
- Mothers Lock Up Your Sons (2005)
- Danger Is (2009)

=== Singles ===
- Dead and Gone/Get Out 7" (2006)
- We Repel Each Other (Split 7" with The Fondas titled From the Songbook of Greg Cartwright) (2006)
- No Home/Lo and Behold 7" (2009)
- Excuse (2011)
- Teeth 7" (2012)

=== Compilations ===
- Patty Duke Fanzine v.6 Love to Patty - COLORS
- Lockengelot Ladenkonzert Sampler - GET OUT

=== Soundtracks ===
- Whip It Soundtrack - Crown Of Age
