= Harp (magazine) =

American music magazine

- Editor: Scott Crawford
- Categories: Music magazines
- Frequency: Bi-monthly
- Publisher: Lee Mergner
- Founded: 2001
- Final issue: March/April 2008
- Company: Guthrie Inc.
- Country: United States
- Based in: Silver Spring, Maryland
- Language: English
- Website: harpmagazine.com (on the Wayback Machine)
- ISSN: 1536-1438

Harp was a print and online magazine that provided in-depth information on current music, mainly the adult album alternative genre, which encompasses a large variety of music. It was published from 2001 to 2008. The sister publication of Harp was Jazz Times.

== History and profile ==
Harp was founded by Scott Crawford in 2001. The magazine was published on a bimonthly basis. The headquarters was in Silver Spring, Maryland. By 2008, Harp had moved well beyond its early AAA roots to become a more general interest magazine (compared in the media to such publications as Mojo, Uncut, Spin, and Paste and Blender) with emphasis on the following genres: indie rock, pop, punk, Americana, psychedelia, and assorted underground subgenres. It was published eight times annually.

On March 17, 2008, Guthrie, Inc., the company that published Harp, officially announced that it would be suspending publication immediately. The last issue sent to subscribers and newsstands was the March/April issue, featuring Dave Grohl on the cover. In a note to subscribers, the publishers indicated that their assets and financial records were being submitted to bankruptcy courts. The demise of Harp came on the heels of a similar announcement by No Depression and a number of other print magazines covering music. Staff of the magazine went on to found Blurt.
