= Gigolo Aunts =

American power pop band

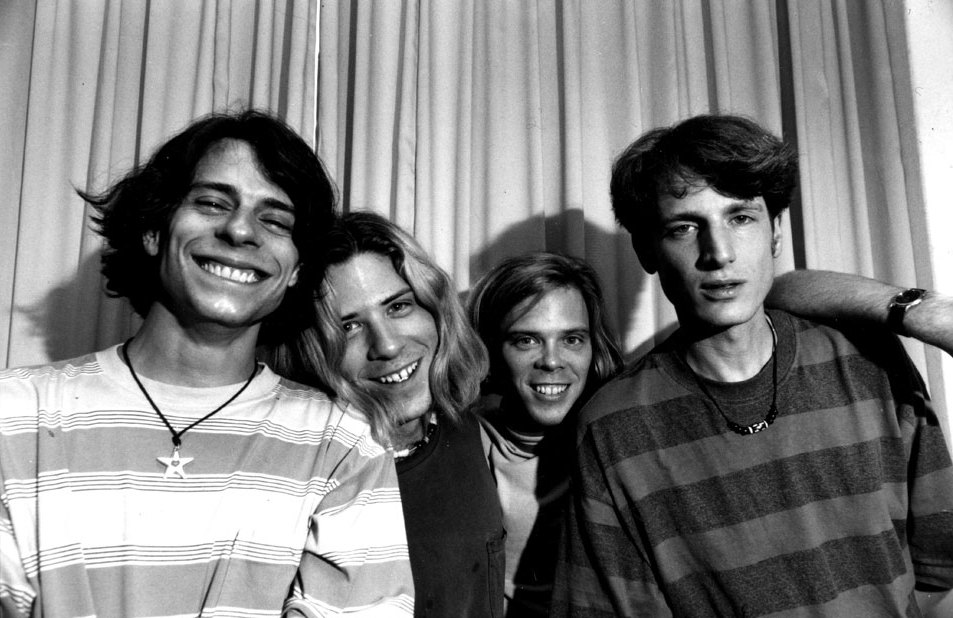
- Gigolo Aunts in Japan

Background information
- Also known as: Sniper
- Origin: Potsdam, New York, United States
- Genres: Indie rock, alternative rock, power pop
- Years active: 1981–present
- Labels: Coyote, Impossible, Summerville, Munster, Fire, Alias, RCA, Wicked Disc, E Pluribus Unum, Bittersweet, Q Division, Love to Art

Gigolo Aunts are an American power pop band, who formed in 1981.

== Biography ==
=== Early history ===
The band was formed by middle school students Steve Hurley, Dave Gibbs, Phil Hurley, and Paul Brouwer in 1981 in Potsdam, New York, United States, originally known as Sniper. In 1986, their name changed to Gigolo Aunts (after the Syd Barrett song, "Gigolo Aunt", from his 1970 album Barrett) and became a staple on the Northern New York music scene, gaining a reputation for frenetic live sets that featured the close harmonies of the Hurley brothers and Gibbs. In the summer of 1987 the band relocated to Boston, Massachusetts, and within a year were signed to Hoboken's Coyote Records (then home of the Feelies and Yo La Tengo). Their first album entitled Everybody Happy was produced by former Bongo bassist (and late version Velvet Underground member), Rob Norris, and released in 1988. After touring up and down the east coast, the band returned to Boston and began working on their follow up album with producer Paul Q. Kolderie. Early in the sessions, Coyote Records folded, and only a handful of songs were finished. After a year of slugging in out in the Boston clubs and recording new songs with Kolderie, the band completed Tales from the Vinegar Side, which was released only in Spain on Impossible Records in 1990. The album produced a modest Boston area radio hit in "Down on Me".

=== Chart success ===
In fall 1991, the band released the "Bloom"/"Cope" 7 inch single on their own Summerville Records. The single garnered rave reviews on both sides of the Atlantic and heavy Boston area airplay, which led to a record deal with Fire Records in the UK. An EP, Full-On Bloom, was released in July 1993 and an album, Flippin' Out, made with producers Mike Deneen and Adam Lasus, was released in the UK in October 1993. The band supported Suede and the Cranberries on their first major U.S. tour and a tour of Japan. The band toured extensively in Europe in support of Flippin' Out, opening for The Wonder Stuff.

After signing to RCA Records in the US early in 1994, the band released the slightly altered American version of Flippin' Out and spent the year supporting the record in Europe and America. Their biggest commercial success was the single, "Where I Find My Heaven", which featured in the soundtrack to the film Dumb and Dumber, and as the opening music to the British sitcom Game On. The single release of "Where I Find My Heaven" broke into the Top 30 in the UK Singles Chart early in 1995. The band also composed the song, "Little Wild One", for the movie, That Thing You Do!

=== Later history ===
In the winter of 1995, drummer Paul Brouwer left and was replaced by Fred Eltringham, then of the Boston band, Jack Drag. In the fall of 1995, the band entered the studio with producer Fred Maher to record the follow-up to Flippin' Out, tentatively titled Ultraphonic. The subsequent recordings were never released and soon after Phil Hurley left the band and was replaced by 6L6 guitarist, Jon Skibic.

In 1996, after getting released from their RCA deal, the band began the long process of ending their relationship with Fire Records. In the meantime, they released an EP, Learn to Play Guitar, on the indie Wicked Disc label, which allowed them to tour extensively in support of the Wallflowers and Counting Crows.

After settling their contract status in 1998, the band signed a new deal with E Pluribus Unum Records, a subsidiary of Universal Records owned and led by Counting Crows' singer, Adam Duritz. The band entered the studio once again with producer Mike Denneen and produced the haunting Minor Chords and Major Themes, which featured the minor hit, "Everyone Can Fly". Minor Chords And Major Themes was a hit in Spain and led to the band's long-standing popularity in that country and appearance at the Benicassim Festival in 1999.

The Gigolo Aunts played a few shows in 2023 including November 15, 2023 at Brooklyn Made, Brooklyn, NY, USA.

== Members ==
Current Members

- Dave Gibbs (vocals/guitar)
- Steve Hurley (bass/vocals)
- Fred Eltringham (drums, 1995-)
- Jon Skibic (lead guitar/vocals, 1995-)

Former Members

- Phil Hurley (lead guitar/vocals, 1981–1995)
- Paul Brouwer (drums, 1981–1995)

Timeline

== Discography ==
=== Albums ===
- Better Than Fish (1987, Demo Tape)
- Everybody Happy (US - 1988, Coyote Records)
- Tales from the Vinegar Side (Spain - 1990, Impossible Records)
- Full-On Bloom (EP) (UK - 1993, Fire Records), (US - 1993, Alias Records)
- Flippin' Out (UK - 1993, Fire Records), (US - 1994, RCA/BMG)
- Learn to Play Guitar (EP) (US - 1997, Wicked Disc)
- Minor Chords and Major Themes (US - 1999, E Pluribus Unum Recordings)
- Everyone Can Fly (EP) (US - 1999, E Pluribus Unum Recordings)
- Pacific Ocean Blues (Spain/Japan - 2002, Bittersweet Recordings), (US - 2003, Q Division Records)

=== Compilation albums ===
- Flippin' Out + Full-On Bloom (UK - 1995, Fire Records)
- Where I Find My Heaven (UK - 1997, Nectar Masters, UK - 1998, Fire Records)
- The One Before the Last (Spain - 2000, Bittersweet Recordings)
- Where I Find My Heaven + Flippin' Out (UK - 2003, Fire Records)
- The Pride Of Potsdam: 20 Years Of Sonic Splendor (2006, Love To Art)

=== Singles ===
- "Bloom" (1991)
- "I Am the Cosmos (Chris Bell Homage)" (1992)
- "Cope" (1992)
- "Bloom" (1993)
- "Gun" (1993)
- "Mrs. Washington" (1993)
- "Shame" (1993)
- "Where I Find My Heaven" (1993)
- "Mrs. Washington" (1994)
- "Cope" (Promo Single) (1994)
- "Bloom" (Promo Single) (1994)
- "Where I Find My Heaven" (1995)
- "Where I Find My Heaven" (Promo Single) (1995)
- "The Big Lie" (Promo Single) (1999)
- "Everyone Can Fly" (Promo Single) (1999)
- "The Girl From Yesterday" (Promo Single - Spain) (2001)
- "Even Though (The One Before the Last)" (Promo Single - Spain) (2002)

=== Selected tracks from other compilations ===
- "They Don't Know", Volume 10 (distributed by RTM/Pinnacle) Catalog Number: 10VCD10 (1994)
- "Where I Find My Heaven", Dumb and Dumber OST (RCA) Catalog Number: 07863 66523 2 (22 November 1994)
- "Mr. Woods", Safe and Sound: A Benefit in Response to the Brookline Clinic Violence (Mercury Records) Catalog Number: 314 534 067-2 (1996)
- "Why Can't This Be Love?", Everybody Wants Some! (of Van Halen) (CherryDisc Records) Catalog Number: CH 5794-2 (1997)
- "You'd Better Get Yourself Together, Baby", Wicked Good Sampler 05 (Universal Music) Catalog Number: UMG3P-21141 (1998)
- "Alcoholiday", What a Concept!: A Salute to Teenage Fanclub (Not Lame Recordings) Catalog Number: NL-089 (2004)
- "I'm Not the One", Substitution Mass Confusion: A Tribute to The Cars (Not Lame Recordings) Catalog Number: NL-102 (2005) attributed to Gigolo Aunts featuring Kid Lightning
