= Everybody Happy =

Studio album by Gigolo Aunts
- Released: 1988
- Genre: Alternative rock, power pop
- Label: Coyote (US)
- Producer: Rob Norris

Gigolo Aunts chronology
Better Than Fish (Demo Tape) (1987)	Everybody Happy (1988)	Tales from the Vinegar Side (1990)

Professional ratings
Review scores
Source	Rating
AllMusic	3/5 stars
The Encyclopedia of Popular Music	2/5 stars

Everybody Happy is the debut studio album by the rock band Gigolo Aunts. It was released in 1988 on Coyote Records.

== Critical reception ==
Trouser Press called the album "sprightly but wimpy and amateurish." Spin called it a "spent piece of used jet trash."

== Track listing ==
US Version (Coyote Records) Catalog Number: TTC 88146 (1988), Formats: LP, Cassette

1. "Summertime Evening" (S. Hurley) 3:50
2. "Avalanche" (S. Hurley) 2:43
3. "Slipping Away" (S. Hurley) 3:17
4. "Marble Statue" (S. Hurley) 3:20
5. "Outside-Inside" (S. Hurley) 3:25
6. "Her Face Contorted" (S. Hurley) 4:25
7. "I Can See" (D. Gibbs, P. Hurley, S. Hurley) 2:47
8. "Coming Clean" (D. Gibbs) 3:12
9. "People Walk Up" (S. Hurley) 4:10
10. "Not for Me" (S. Hurley) 2:35
11. "Holy Toledo" (S. Hurley) 2:22
12. "Is Everybody Happy?" (S. Hurley) 3:25
