= Big Dipper (band) =

American indie rock band

- Origin: Boston, Massachusetts, United States
- Genres: Alternative rock, indie rock,
- Years active: 1985–1990, 2007–present
- Labels: Homestead, Demon, Epic, Merge, Almost Ready
- Members: Bill Goffrier; Steve Michener; Jeff Oliphant; Gary Waleik
- Website: https://www.mergerecords.com/artist/big_dipper

Big Dipper are an American indie rock band who formed in Boston, Massachusetts, United States, in 1985 by former members of Volcano Suns and the Embarrassment. They released four studio albums between 1987 and 1990, before splitting up. The band reunited in 2008. They were described in a New York Times article as "musical contortionists: they love to toy with extremes, juxtaposing ferocious guitar noise with celestial vocal harmonies or planting a delicate melody in jagged rhythm".

== History ==
In 1986, two former Volcano Suns members, bassist Steve Michener (also in Dumptruck) and guitarist/vocalist Gary Waleik recruited guitarist/vocalist Bill Goffrier (formerly of the Embarrassment) and drummer Jeff Oliphant (formerly of XS and the Iron Gerbils); Waleik and Oliphant were cousins. Goffrier had struck up a friendship with Waleik when he attended a Volcano Suns gig in mid-1985, and the next year, they formed Big Dipper.

Big Dipper recorded a six-song demo, and one of the tracks, "Faith Healer", received regular airplay from local college radio stations. Their first release was the 1987 extended play Boo-Boo, issued by Homestead Records (and by Demon Records in the UK). Their first full-length studio album, Heavens, released later in 1987, was later described by AllMusic as "one of the finest American indie albums of its era". The album sleeve featured Goffrier's painting of a UFO.

Their second album, Craps, followed in 1988. One of the tracks on the album reflected Goffrier's interest in extraterrestrial phenomena, with the song "Semjase" focusing on Swiss farmer Billy Meier, who in the 1970s claimed to have been regularly visited by a female from the Pleaides. Having fulfilled their contractual obligations to Homestead, Big Dipper opted to leave Homestead and look for a label that had better distribution.

Big Dipper signed to Epic Records for 1990's Slam. Michener left the band, and they continued with various players for two years, splitting up in 1992 after releasing the "Approach of a Human Being" single (1991, Feel Good All Over) and recording more than an album's worth of material.

In 2008, Merge Records released Supercluster: The Big Dipper Anthology, a 3-disc collection of Big Dipper's Homestead recordings, with additional material including the unreleased tracks recorded after Michener left. This renewed interest prompted the band to reform for some live shows in April 2008.

In 2009, the Big Dipper songs "All Going Out Together", "She's Fetching" and "Younger Bums" were featured in the Rock Band video game series.

In 2011, their 1987 song "All Going Out Together" appeared in the Mark Pellington film I Melt with You, and on its soundtrack.

In November 2012, the reformed Big Dipper released their first new studio album in 22 years, Big Dipper Crashes on the Platinum Planet, on Almost Ready Records.

Their song "Ron Klaus Wrecked His House" appeared in the 2016 film Gold, and on its soundtrack.

== Discography ==
=== Studio albums ===
- Heavens (1987, Homestead Records)
- Craps (1988, Homestead Records)
- Slam (1990, Epic Records)
- Big Dipper Crashes on the Platinum Planet (2012, Almost Ready Records)

=== Singles and EPs ===
- Boo-Boo 12" EP (1987, Homestead Records)
- "All Going Out Together" 12" single (1987, Homestead Records)
- "Jet" (split with the Droogs) 7" single (1989, Bucketfull of Brains)
- "Love Barge" 12" single (1990, Epic Records)
- "Approach of a Human Being" 7" single (1991, Feel Good All Over)
- "Joke Outfit" 7" single (2013, Almost Ready Records)

=== Compilation albums ===
- Supercluster: The Big Dipper Anthology (2008, Merge Records)

=== Compilation appearances ===
- "You're Not Patsy" on The Wailing Ultimate (1987, Homestead Records)
- "Lou Gehrig's Disease" on None Whatsoever (1987, Vacant Lot)
- "He Is God" on Human Music (1988, Homestead Records)
- "Making Plans for Bison" (Shonen Knife cover) on Every Band Has a Shonen Knife Who Loves Them (1989, Giant Records)
- "Another Life" on Theodore: An Alternative Music Sampler (1990, Columbia Records/Epic Records)
- "Homosapien" (Pete Shelley cover) on Freedom of Choice: Yesterday's New Wave Hits as Performed by Today's Stars (1992, Caroline Records)
- "Ron Klaus Wrecked His House" on 39 Steps to Seattle: An Alternative American History (1994, Demon Records)
- "Extraordinary Worm" on Pipeline! Live Boston Rock on W.M.B.R. (1996, Slow River Records)
- "She's Fetching" and "A Song to Be Beautiful" on SCORE! Twenty Years of Merge Records (2009, Merge Records)
- "You're Not Patsy" on Roots of Nirvana (Distorted Sounds From the Punk Underground) (2011, Mojo)
- "All Going Out Together" on I Melt with You (Lakeshore Records)
- "Ron Klaus Wrecked His House" on Gold - Original Motion Picture Soundtrack (2017, Varèse Sarabande)
