= Phil Hurley =

American singer-songwriter

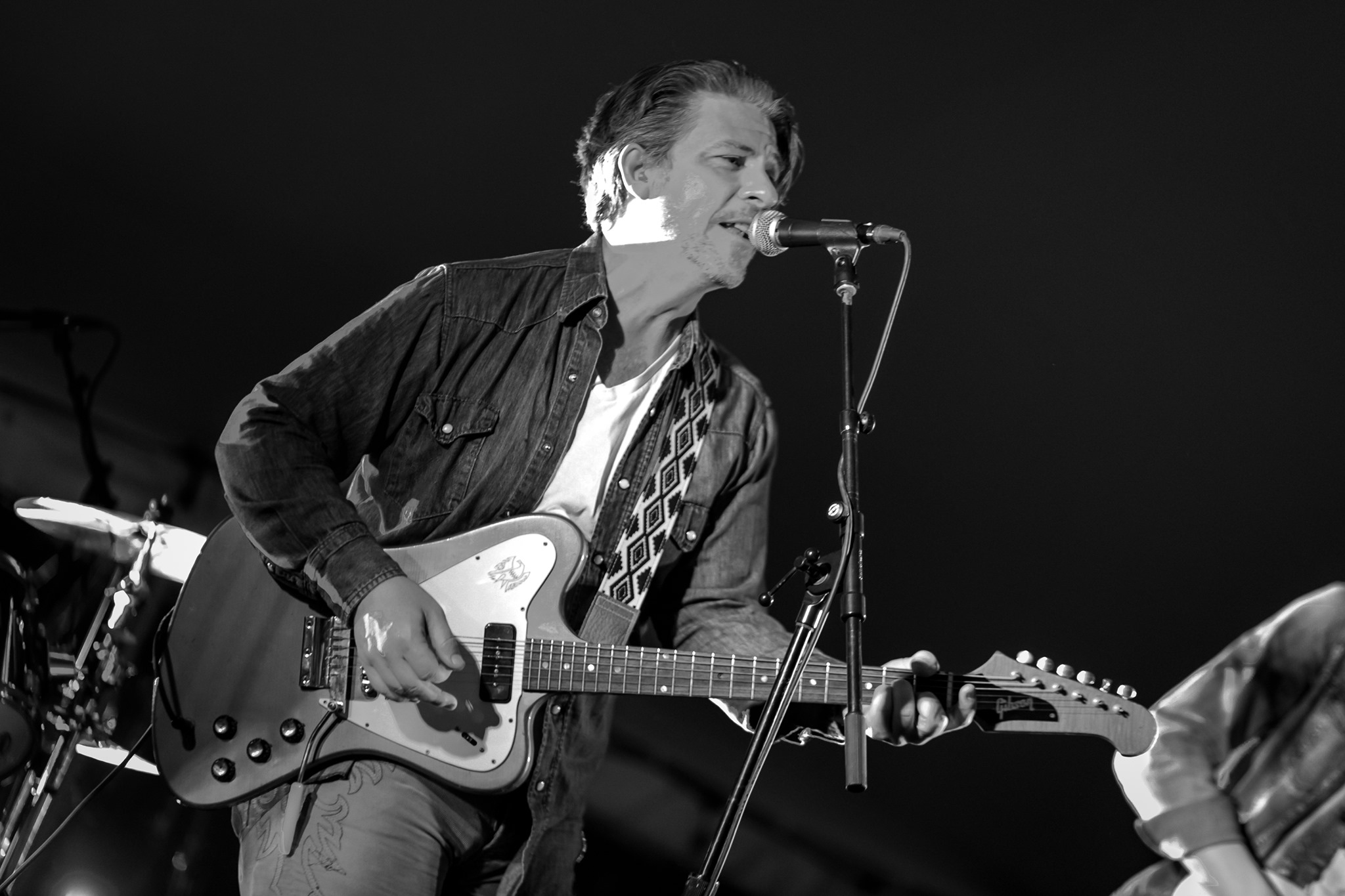
- Hurley performing in 2020

Background information
- Born: Phil Hurley; 7 October 1969 (age 56); Potsdam, New York
- Genres: Rock; power pop; Americana
- Occupations: Singer; songwriter; musician
- Instruments: Vocals; guitar; bass
- Years active: 1985–present
- Labels: Coyote Records; RCA; Island; Atlantic; Music Road
- Website: philhurleymusic.com

Phil Hurley is an American singer, songwriter, and musician best known for being a founding member of Gigolo Aunts, Stonehoney, and South Austin Moonlighters. He toured extensively as the lead guitarist for Tracy Bonham, Jimmy LaFave, and Fountains of Wayne, among others. Hurley co-wrote the theme songs for Lucky Louie and The Greg Behrendt Show, as well as having many of his songs used in films and TV shows. Hurley released a solo acoustic album, Nowhere Left to Run, in 2019.

== Music career ==
Singing in rock bands with his brother Steve from the age of eight, Hurley was playing music in upstate New York professionally by the age of fourteen on bass, drums, guitar and vocals.

Hurley toured extensively with recording artist, Tracy Bonham, then stepped away to participate in the fertile Seattle music scene, where he recorded with groups such as Tycoons, Hulabees, Shuggie, Alex Woodard, Miles Hunt (of The Wonder Stuff), Lisa Loeb, and Fountains of Wayne, among others.

He then spent a year in the Netherlands before moving to Los Angeles, CA and in February 2009, relocated to Austin, Texas, where he toured and played with his country-rock group Stonehoney.

- Gigolo Aunts

Hurley formed the band, Gigolo Aunts, while still in high school with his brother Steve Hurley, Dave Gibbs, and Paul Brouwer. After quickly outgrowing Potsdam, the group relocated to Boston, where they caught the ear of the indie label, Coyote Records, which released the Aunts' first record, Everybody Happy, in 1988. Later the band was signed to a major label deal with RCA, touring extensively in the US and Europe with groups such as, The Cranberries, The Wallflowers, and The Lemonheads. Their songs have been featured in TV shows and films, That Thing You Do!, The River Wild, Swimming With Sharks, The Buddy System, and the title track to Dumb and Dumber, Where I Find My Heaven. The band, at one point in their career, was signed to (Counting Crows) Adam Duritz' record label, E Pluribus Unum, and toured extensively with Counting Crows.

Their biggest commercial success was the single, Where I Find My Heaven, which was featured in the soundtrack to the film Dumb and Dumber, and as the opening music to the British sitcom, Game On. The single release of, Where I Find My Heaven, broke into the Top 30 in the UK Singles Chart early in 1995.

- Stonehoney

In 2006, Hurley created the country-rock group, StoneHoney with fellow Los Angeles singer-songwriters Shawn Davis, Nick Randolph, and Dave Phenecie. StoneHoney toured extensively across the US, and found their musical home when they relocated to Austin, Texas in 2009, signing to Jimmy LaFave's, Music Road Records.

- The South Austin Moonlighters

Hurley was a founding member of Austin super group, South Austin Moonlighters, playing lead guitar and contributing some of their most requested original songs. The group has released three albums: Live at the Saxon Pub, Burn & Shine, and Ghost of a Small Town, garnering regional radio and touring success.
