= Dave Gibbs (musician) =

American singer-songwriter (born 1965)

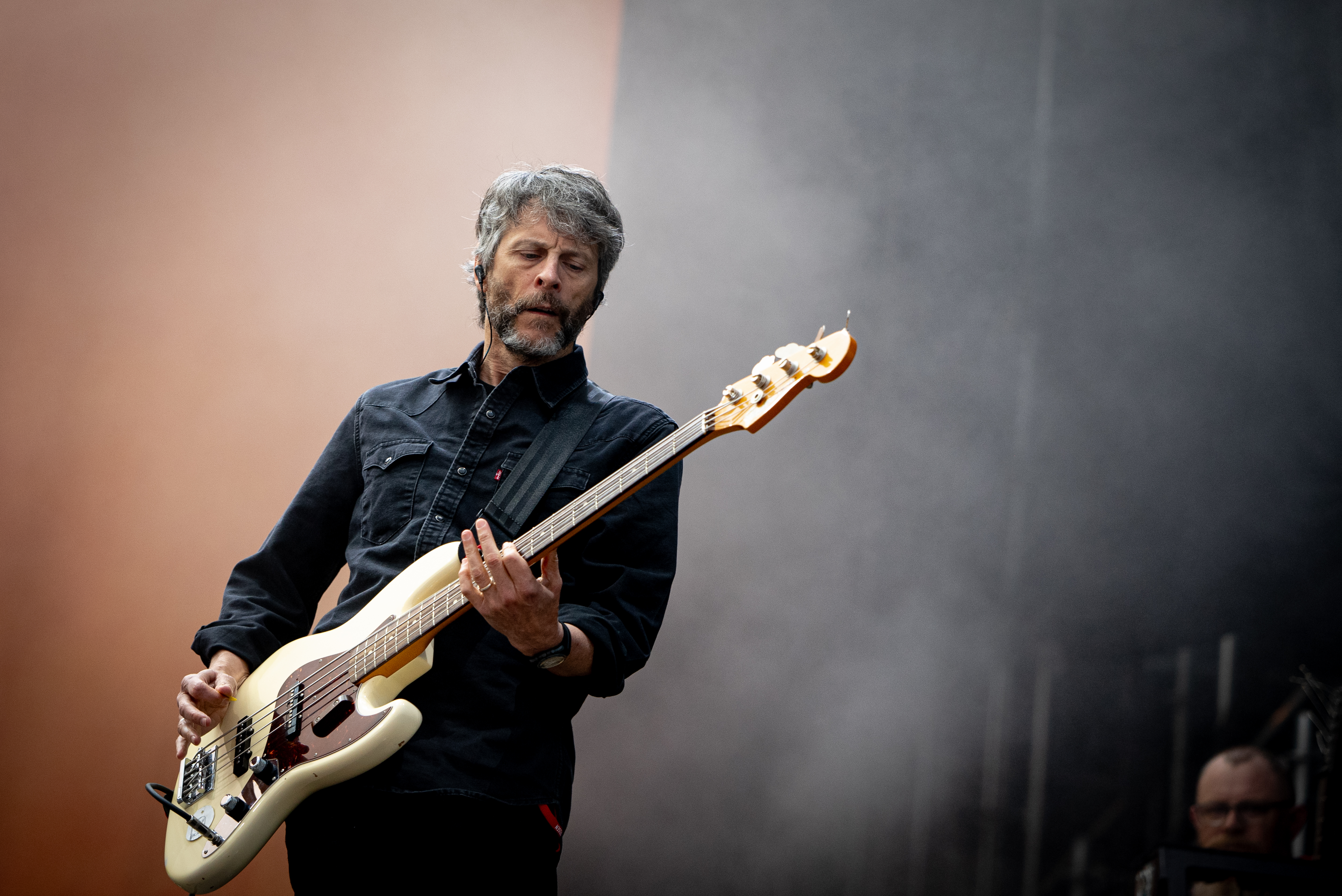
Gibbs with Tom Morello in 2024

Dave Gibbs (born August 22, 1965) is an American singer-songwriter, best known for his work in the Boston-based power-pop band, Gigolo Aunts. Born and raised in Potsdam, New York, Gibbs co-founded the Gigolo Aunts with brothers Steve and Phil Hurley, and drummer Paul Brower in 1986. Relocating to Boston, the group gained a following after a string of self-released tapes and singles, finally catching the attention of English label, Fire Records, which released their 1993 album, Flippin' Out. The band was signed in the US to RCA Records, who re-released the album in 1994. Gibbs also contributed backing vocals to albums by Providence, Rhode Island pop-rockers Velvet Crush, with whom he toured as lead guitarist on and off through the early 1990s.

Gibbs moved to Los Angeles in 1999, and has written songs for films and television, most notably the soundtrack to Josie and the Pussycats. He collaborated with Steve Hurley, Jane Wiedlin, Jason Falkner and Babyface on the album, which was certified Gold in 2003. Gibbs has also contributed music to Mr. Deeds, That Thing You Do!, Everwood, Alias, One Tree Hill, Smallville, Black Sash, What About Brian, Falcon Beach, Men in Trees and others. Alongside Adam Duritz and Ryan Adams he also composed the track "Los Angeles" from the Counting Crows record Saturday Nights & Sunday Mornings.

In 2004 he released a solo album (Her Smallest Breath Is Full of Grace) under the name Kid Lightning on the Spanish label Bittersweet.

In 2005 he began working on the musical Rock of Ages as it was developed in Los Angeles. Along with Kyle Puccia, Gibbs orchestrated and arranged the songs in the show, as well as played guitar in the band. He has been with the show since, serving as music supervisor for the Las Vegas, Norwegian Cruise Line, Toronto, Australian and UK productions, as well playing guitar for the off-Broadway, Broadway, Toronto and First Natl. Tour of the show, and also producing the Original Cast Recording.

In 2011 he had a small part in the movie adaptation playing the lead guitarist in the fictional band Arsenal, led by Tom Cruise.

He was a founding member of Low Stars, a country-rock act signed to Starbucks' Hear Music label. He is an active supporter of various left-wing causes, and has played with musician/activist Tom Morello at his shows benefitting Axis of Justice. He has also been involved with fundraising for the Audrey Hepburn Children's Fund.

Gibbs currently plays bass for Street Sweeper Social Club and The Nightwatchman. Live, he uses a Yamaha BB414 Bass, and often sings backing vocals. He has also been seen live with a Fender Mustang Bass or Epiphone Thunderbird.
