= The Palladium Book of Weapons & Armour =

Fantasy role-playing game supplement

- Cover art by Scott Johnson
- Designers: Matthew Balent
- Illustrators: John Benson; Scott Johnson; Kevin Siembieda; Mary Walsh
- Publishers: Palladium Books
- Publication: 1981
- Genres: Fantasy

The Palladium Book of Weapons & Armour is a 1981 role-playing game supplement published by Palladium Books.

== Contents ==
The Palladium Book of Weapons & Armour is a supplement in which 35 historical types of armor and more than 600 medieval and ancient weapons are detailed. Although statistics are given for the role-playing system developed by Palladium, the contents are also compatible with Advanced Dungeons & Dragons.

== Publication history ==
The Palladium Book of Weapons & Armour was compiled by Matthew Balent and published by Palladium Books in 1981 as a saddle-stitched book in its first print, with a square-bound version published that same year. This material was later revised and incorporated into The Compendium of Weapons, Armour & Castles in 1989. The book sold well, and Balent went on to compile The Palladium Book of Weapons & Castles in 1982. He also worked on The Palladium Book of Weapons and Castles of the Orient (1984) and The Palladium Book of European Castles (1985). (Another book in the series, The Palladium Book of Contemporary Weapons (1984), was written by Maryann and Brian Siembieda.)

Shannon Appelcline notes that "Matthew [Balent] – one of a few future Palladium writers who Siembieda met through the Detroit Gaming Centre – was working on a reference book that could be used in fantasy roleplaying games. As a Library Sciences graduate he had the skill and knowledge required to pick through hundreds of books to create a general overview of medieval armour and armaments. The Palladium Book of Weapons & Armor (1981) was the first of several books that [Balent] compiled for Palladium and which they would print, reprint, revise, recollect and print yet again over the years. They were the company's first 'quiet hit'."

== Reception ==
In Issue 17 of Abyss (February 1982), Dave Nalle commented, "This work shows a great deal of research, and details a vast number of unusual weapons, all with adequate illustrations." The only issues Nalle found with the book was an index that was "arranged strangely" and the weapons were divided into types. Nalle pointed out, "Just where they are divided is unclear as there are no group headings given, and some weapons don't fit too well into the unavoidable definition classes." Despite this Nalle concluded, "This is an excellent aid for any serious medieval or fantasy referee."
