= Weapons (Turtle Press) =

Weapons is a 1981 fantasy role-playing game supplement published by Turtle Press.

== Contents ==
Weapons is a comprehensive compendium covering nearly every edged or impact melee weapon used across medieval and primitive cultures. Weapons is an indexed reference book with hundreds of illustrated entries of melee weapons, organized into six sections covering swords, knives, hafted weapons, spears, pole arms, and miscellaneous arms.

== Publication history ==
Weapons was written by Matthew Balent and published in 1981 by Turtle Press, and was later revised and included in The Compendium of Weapons, Armour & Castles.

Matthew Balent was among the small group of future Palladium Books writers whom Kevin Siembieda first met through the Detroit Gaming Center. Balent was, at the time, developing a reference book intended for use in fantasy role-playing games. As a Library Sciences graduate, Balent had the expertise to sift through hundreds of sources to produce a broad survey of medieval armor and weaponry. The Palladium Book of Weapons & Armor (1981) was the first in a series of reference works Balent compiled for Palladium. Balent also compiled The Palladium Book of Weapons & Castles in 1982. He also worked on The Palladium Book of Weapons and Castles of the Orient (1984) and The Palladium Book of European Castles (1985). (Another book in the series, The Palladium Book of Contemporary Weapons (1984), was written by Maryann and Brian Siembieda.)

== Reception ==
Lewis Pulsipher reviewed Weapons in The Space Gamer No. 43. Pulsipher commented that "In my view there is no need to add weapons to those already in most FRPG; but if you must, you'll need to look them up in a good source to get some detail. Ten times as much information about a tenth as many weapons, presented more professionally, would have been much more useful. In short, Weapons is virtually useless."

== Reviews ==
- Adventure Gaming #9
