= Hullabaloo (band) =

American punk and grunge band

- Origin: Cambridge, Massachusetts
- Genres: Punk rock, grunge, alternative rock
- Years active: 1986–1993, 2013–present
- Labels: Gawdawful Records; Toxic Shock Records; Musical Tragedies; C/Z Records; Zuma Records; Wondertaker Records
- Members: TQ (Thomas Quinn); John Quinn; Sluggo; Kevin James; Pete Foley
- Past members: Lloyd Dyson III; Chris Rossow; Mark Lax; Scott Ewen; Matt Lyon

Hullabaloo is a punk/grunge band from Cambridge, Massachusetts, started in 1986 by guitarist/vocalist Sluggo and vocalist/multi-instrumentalist TQ. The band cites myriad influences from John Coltrane to Iron Maiden and King Diamond contributing to their at times "surreal" and "psychedelic" sound. They also employed unusual instrumentation for a band of their ilk; TQ playing trumpet, tenor sax and electric piano in addition to vocals.

Hullabaloo released several LPs and EPs on various labels over the years, and changed from a quartet to a quintet and back again with varying lineups. Guitarist Kevin James joined the band in 1989 and was a mainstay, with TQ, until the band fizzled out in 1993.

Recently, the band has released several archived live performances in digital format, and has announced a reunion show for WMBR's Pipeline show 25th Anniversary Festival.

== History ==
=== Early years: 1986–1989 ===
Along with TQ and Sluggo, the original lineup included Lloyd Dyson III on bass and TQ's brother John Quinn on drums. Lloyd left the group within a few months to be replaced by Pete Foley. Both Lloyd and Pete appear on Hullabaloo's initial EP – It's Not Enough to be Loud, You Have to Suck to. released by Gawdawful Records. Maximum Rock and Roll called it "Rowdy, dischordant, all hell-bent, psycho riotous musical mania."

Later in 1988, Hullabaloo collaborated with several other bands on Suffer This: A Compilation of Boston's Backwash, also on Gawdawful Records. Hullabaloo contributed three songs, including a cover of Judas Priest's Breakin' the Law.

In 1989 Hullabaloo was signed to the Toxic Shock out of Tucson, Arizona, which featured albums by such far-flung bands as Hickoids and Skin Yard They released their full-length Album, Beat Until Stiff, and toured the United States, performing with labelmates Hickoids, Jesus Chrysler, and House of Large Sizes at various dates. Other notable shows included Cows in Minneapolis, The Hell Cows in Seattle and The Mudwimmin in San Francisco. The Seattle show brought Hullabaloo to the attention of the burgeoning Seattle music scene, where they met Daniel House of C/Z Records and Nirvana.

Hullabaloo gained some notoriety during this time by occasionally playing naked, in public. Byron Coley mentions this in his review of Beat Until Stiff in SPIN Magazine.

Also in 1989 the band participated in Boston's famed Rock 'n' Roll Rumble. They narrowly lost their night to ultimate runner-up Ultra Blue, though they were favorably reviewed for their performance.

=== Changing line-ups; 1990–1991 ===
At the end of 1989, Pete decided to leave the band. A search for a new bass player proved fruitless, so JQ volunteered to move to bass, Chris Rossow was added on drums, and Kevin James, formerly of Loving Six, joined as a second guitar. The lineup produced a more grunge sound, with the dual guitar attack. They also continued to explore odd meters and unusual song forms. Dead Serious was also released in Europe on the Musical Tragedies label, where it caused quite a stir due to the cover art, being censored in Germany. The label blocked out the genitalia, then offered to send a sticker to replace it, if sent pornography in the mail.

Dead Serious and Beat Until Stiff were subsequently released together on a single CD.

As the band prepared to tour in support of Dead Serious a dispute with drummer Chris Rossow occurred, causing him to leave the band. At this point John returned to drums and Sluggo took over bass duties. The tour, which started with dates in Canada, abruptly ended in Dayton, Ohio when the band ran out of money.

Upon returning to Boston, this lineup recorded the LP Lubritorium for C/Z Records, after which Sluggo left the band for the west coast, where he founded the bands Ain't and The Grannies. Soon after John Quinn left as well.

=== Later years; 1992–1994 ===
The band released the EP The United Colors of Hullabaloo on Musical Tragedies to coincide with a European tour, which began in November 1992. The lineup at this time consisted of TQ, Kevin James and newcomers Scott Ewen on bass and Matt Lyon on drums.

In 1993 Sluggo gathered early, unreleased studio and live recordings together with the tracks from the It's Not Enough to be Loud... EP into a CD release entitled Regurgitator which was also released by Musical Tragedies.

The European tour was a moderate success, grabbing the attention of Zuma Records. Zuma released Bruiser; Hullabaloo's final studio album in 1994.

=== Other recordings and recent activity ===
Over the years, the band released many songs on various compilations, notably Noise from Nowhere Vol. 2 on Toxic Shock which also included Hickoids, Sloppy Seconds, and House of Large Sizes, and Hard to Believe: Kiss Covers Compilation which featured Nirvana and The Melvins.

All of Hullabaloo's recordings have been re-issued in digital format, by Wondertaker Records, and are available on all digital purveyors. On Dec. 4, 2012 the band released, in digital format, a recording of their first performance at CBGB 25 years to the day after it happened. They subsequently released a recording of the band performing on WBCN's Boston Emissions show in 1990. They are currently planning to release, digitally and on CD, live performances from WMBR's Pipeline show to coincide with a reunion show for Pipeline's 25th anniversary.

== Discography ==
=== Albums and EPs ===
- It's Not Enough to be Loud, You Have to Suck to. (EP 1988, Gawdawful Records)
- Beat Until Stiff (LP 1989, Toxic Shock)
- Dead Serious (EP, CD 1990 [CD includes Beat Until Stiff], Toxic Shock (US), Musical Tragedies (Europe))
- Lubritorium (LP, CD 1991 C/Z Records)
- United Colors of Hullabaloo (CD, 1992 Musical Tragedies)
- Regurgitator CD release of It's Not Enough to be Loud... plus unreleased studio and live recordings (CD, 1993 Musical Tragedies)
- Brusier (CD, Zuma Records)

=== Compilation albums ===
- Suffer This: A Compilation of Boston's Backwash (LP 1988, Gawdawful Records)
- Teriyaki Asthma Volume II (7-inch EP, C/Z Records)
- Noise from Nowhere #2 (7-inch EP, Toxic Shock)
- Noise from Nowhere #9 (7-inch Single, Toxic Shock)
- Decade of Disaster (CD, Westworld)
- Teryaki Asthma Volume I-V (CD, C/Z Records)
- Hard to Believe: Kiss Covers Compilation (LP, CD, C/Z Records)
