= Beat Until Stiff =

1989 studio album by Hullabaloo

Studio album by Hullabaloo
- Released: 1989
- Recorded: by Paul Q. Kolderie, 1989 at Fort Apache South, Roxbury, MA, † 1988 at Fishtraks, Portsmouth, NH
- Genre: Noise rock, post-hardcore, grunge
- Length: 33:04
- Label: Toxic Shock
- Producer: Paul Q. Kolderie

Hullabaloo chronology
It's Not Enough to be Loud, You Have to Suck to. (1988)	Beat Until Stiff (1989)	Dead Serious (1990)

Beat Until Stiff is the second release, and first full-length album, by Hullabaloo. It was released in 1989 on Toxic Shock. For Beat Until Stiff, TQ had taken over as full-time lead singer for the band (though Sluggo sings on the tune "Taskmaster" and hidden track "Sea of Trash"), and his vocals that range from a growl to a scream begin to characterize the band's sound. The band's punk rock sensibilities are still in the forefront with fast, thrashy songs like "The Lickyerbutt Song" and "This is My Rifle", and with subjects like "Retardo Porn" and "Suicidal Maniac." But with the songs "Beat Until Stiff" and "Gotta Go" some slower tempos and heavier guitars are introduced, giving the album a proto-grunge feel. The trademark trumpet and saxophone solos are still present throughout. Kris Fell, in the Boston Phoenix said that the "lyrics on Beat Until Stiff are blunt, almost photographic representation of the grotesque..." This album features a guitar solo by Mr. Horribly Charred Infant of the Happy Flowers.

Note that Hullabaloo rarely used their real names and instruments on the personnel listing of their records. The names on this record are their "British Invasion" names. These names are also scrawled upon a picture of the British invasion band The Hullaballoos on the inner sleeve.

Beat Until Stiff's new songs were recorded and mixed at the Fort Apache South studio by Paul Q. Kolderie. Kolderie also re-mixed the two previously released songs for this album. The cover art for the album lists the producers as "Hugo & Luigi," but this is yet another allusion to The Hullaballoos, who were "packaged for U.S. consumption by Hugo Peretti and Luigi Creatore, notorious vice presidents and A&R directors of Roulette Records.".

== Critical reception ==
Beat Until Stiff rolls like a big old tank truck fulla beer and piss taking a fast turn onto Alice Cooper Memorial Turnpike.—Spin

Here's a totally psychotic mindfuck if there ever was one....Satan himself would shit his pants if he heard the vocals on this album.—GROT

An album worth having two copies of, for when your first wears out.—Backlash

TQ hollers as if possessed by the spirits of both Ozzy and Jimmy Swaggart while the band bashes out chords of destruction and disarray...—CMJ

If Marlon Brando's Godfather figure had been played by a growling lion, he would be the singer of this band.—Rockpool

== Track listing ==
All tracks are written by Hullabaloo, except where noted.

Side Kick
No.	Title	Writer(s)	Length
1.	"Gotta Go"		3:54
2.	"Beat Until Stiff"		3:43
3.	"Suicidal Maniac"		2:00
4.	"The Lickyerbutt Song †" (previously released on Suffer This: A Compilation of Boston's Backwash)		1:56
5.	"The Violent Death of Johnny Camaro"		2:58
6.	"Hole Lotta Rosie" (cassette only bonus track)	Angus Young, Malcolm Young, Bon Scott	3:34

Side Order
No.	Title	Length
1.	"Louisville Slugger"	2:21
2.	"Retardo Porn" (guitar solo by Mr. Horribly Charred Infant of the Happy Flowers)	3:31
3.	"B.H.T."	3:24
4.	"Taskmaster †" (previously released on Suffer This: A Compilation of Boston's Backwash)	3:58
5.	"This is my Rifle"	2:19
6.	"Sea of Trash" (hidden track)	2:59

== Personnel ==
Hullabaloo

- Spanker Phelge (a possible allusion to "Nanker Phelge", a composer pseudonym used by Rolling Stones vocalist Mick Jagger and guitarist Keith Richards)
- Ronny Sores
- Harry "Squirty" Sores
- Horseglue Minibike

Technical personnel

- Paul Kolderie - Recording of all songs except †; Mixing of all songs
- Jeff Landrock - Recording of †
- J.J. Gonson - Photography
