= Hard to Believe =

Hard to Believe may refer to:

- Hard to Believe: A Kiss Covers Compilation, 1990 album
- "Hard to Believe" (David Cook song), from the 2011 album This Loud Morning
- "Hard to Believe" (Eraserheads song), from the 1997 album Sticker Happy
- "Hard to Believe", song from the 1967 album, Pisces, Aquarius, Capricorn & Jones Ltd., by The Monkees
