= Live: No Time for Tuning =

Live: No Time For Tuning

Live album by Sloppy Seconds
- Released: 1996
- Recorded: The Emerson Theater, Indianapolis, Indiana, US
- Genre: Punk rock
- Label: Triple X

Sloppy Seconds chronology
Knock Yer Block Off (1993)	Live: No Time For Tuning (1996)	More Trouble Than They're Worth (1998)

Live: No Time for Tuning is the first live album by Sloppy Seconds. It was released in 1996 on Triple X Records, and was recorded at The Emerson Theater in their hometown Indianapolis, Indiana.

== Track listing ==
1. "I Don't Wanna Be a Homosexual" – 4:52
2. "Mighty Heroes" – 2:13
3. "Come Back, Traci" – 1:59
4. "Human Waste" – 2:13
5. "Veronica" – 2:24
6. "Horror Of Party Beach" – 1:50
7. "Men" – 2:00
8. "Lynchtown U.S.A." – 1:39
9. "Your Sister" – 1:27
10. "Steal Your Beer" – 2:05
11. "I Can't Slow Down" – 2:41
12. "Candy Man" – 1:30
13. "Pop My Dick Song" – 0:38
14. "Queen of Outer Space" – 3:12
15. "I Want 'em Dead" – 2:26
16. "Take You Home" – 1:27
17. "Ice Cream Man" – 2:11
18. "So Fucked Up" – 4:02
19. "Germany" – 2:42
20. "Kids Are All Drunk" – 2:27
21. "Runnin' from the C.I.A." – 2:33
22. "Sorry, Dude" – 0:41

== Credits ==
- B.A. – vocals
- Steve Sloppy – drums
- Ace Hardware – guitar
- Bo'Ba Jam – bass
- Paul Mahern – engineer, mixing
- Mike Kreffel – artwork, illustrations
- Andy Berry AKA JIMM CALIGULA – producer
- Scott Crays, "sorry dude"
