= Weapon (disambiguation) =

A weapon is a tool for hunting or fighting.

Weapon or Weapons may also refer to:

== Music ==
- Weapon (band), a Canadian blackened death metal band
- Weapons (band), an indie/pop indie/punk band from Iceland
- Weapon (album), a 2013 album by industrial band Skinny Puppy
- Weapon (EP), an EP by Six Finger Satellite
- Weapons (album), an album by Lostprophets
- "Weapon" (song), a 2002 song by Matthew Good
- "weapon", a 2021 song by Against the Current
- "Weapons", a 2009 song by Jars of Clay from the album The Long Fall Back to Earth
- "Weapons" (song), a 2023 song by Ava Max

== Film ==
- Weapons (2007 film), an American teenage crime drama
- Weapon (film), an Indian Tamil-language action thriller film
- Weapons (2025 film), an American horror film

== Others ==
- Weapon (Final Fantasy), creatures from the Final Fantasy series
- Weapons (Turtle Press), 1981 fantasy tabletop game supplement
- Weapon (novel), by Robert Mason
- Weapon (biology), traits used by males to fight for access to mates
- Weapon-class destroyer, class of destroyers built for the British Royal Navy towards the end of World War II

== See also ==
- The Weapon (disambiguation)
- Military technology and equipment
