= Dead Serious (EP) =

1990 EP by Hullabaloo

EP by Hullabaloo
- Released: 1990
- Recorded: By Paul Kolderie, 1990 at Fort Apache Studios, Cambridge, Massachusetts, United States
- Genres: Noise rock, post-hardcore, grunge
- Labels: Toxic Shock (US); Musical Tragedies (Europe)
- Producer: Kevin James

Hullabaloo chronology
Beat Until Stiff (1989)	Dead Serious (1990)	Lubritorium (1991)

Dead Serious is the third release, and second EP by Hullabaloo. It was recorded in 1990 by Paul Kolderie at the Fort Apache Studios in Cambridge, Massachusetts. It was released by Toxic Shock in the United States and Musical Tragedies in Europe. The band's lineup had changed significantly since their previous release, Beat Until Stiff. Their previous bass player (Pete Foley) had left the band. He was replaced on bass by former drummer John Quinn, who was in turn replaced on drums by Chris Rossow. In addition, the band added a second guitar player, Kevin James, formerly of noise-rock instrumental band The Loving Six. James also produced the recording.

The five original songs on the EP show that the transition started with Beat Until Stiff had completed, as band's sound had moved away from punk, more fully into the territory of grunge. The extra guitar makes for a much heavier sound, and the tempos are slower and songs longer that on previous releases. Nonetheless, the band continued to experiment with unusual song forms and odd meters. And the unusual instrumentation comes to the forefront: the song "Die Laughing" begins with a prominent, blaring trumpet solo, and "Curse of Civilization" features TQ on an extended sax solo as well.

The record also includes a cover of Led Zeppelin's "The Rain Song" in which the organ parts are transcribed and played by TQ on saxophones.

This record caused quite a stir in Europe due to its cover art. The cover was censored, but the Musical Tragedies label allowed consumers to obtain a sticker with the missing organs if they sent in pornography.

The CD, released in 1991, includes all of Beat Until Stiff as well, plus Hullabaloo's cover of Deep Purple's "Highway Star", previously released on the 7" compilation single "Noise from Nowhere Vol. 2" on Toxic Shock.

As with Beat Until Stiff before it, Dead Serious was recorded at the Fort Apache Studios by Paul Q. Kolderie.

== Track listing ==
All tracks are written by Hullabaloo, except where noted.

This Side
No.	Title	Length
1.	"Die Laughing"	3:38
2.	"For Richard Stands"	2:33
3.	"Curse of Civilization"	5:55

Other Side
No.	Title	Writer(s)	Length
4.	"Drink to Get Drunk"		4:28
5.	"Unkindness of Ravens"		3:35
6.	"The Rain Song"	Page/Plant	6:59

CD only bonus track
No.	Title	Writer(s)	Length
7.	"Highway Star"	Ritchie Blackmore, Ian Gillan, Roger Glover, Jon Lord, Ian Paice	3:42

== Personnel ==
The Hullabaloo Singers & Orchestra

- Douglas "Fraser" Cawley - Guitar
- Kevin "Scott" James - Guitar & Sitar
- John "Moses" Quinn - Bass
- Thomas Edward Quinn, "Jr." - Vocals & Horns
- Christopher "Ward" Rossow - Drums

with

- Ziad Aoude - Harp

Production and other personnel

- Kevin James - Producer
- Paul Kolderie - Engineer
- John Shafer - photography
- Peter Papadopoulis - photography
