= It's Not Enough to be Loud, You Have to Suck to. =

1988 album by Hullabaloo

EP by Hullabaloo
- Released: 1988
- Recorded: July and November 1987 and January 1988 at Fishtraks, Portsmouth, NH
- Genres: Noise rock, post-hardcore
- Length: 22:10
- Label: Gawdawful Records
- Producer: Hullabaloo

Hullabaloo chronology
| It's Not Enough to be Loud, You Have to Suck to. (1988) | Beat Until Stiff (1989) |

Regurgitator

Compilation album by Hullabaloo
- Released: 1993
- Recorded: July and November 1987 and January and April 1988 at Fishtraks, Portsmouth, NH; 1987 at The Rat, Boston, MA
- Genres: Noise rock, post-hardcore
- Length: 22:10
- Label: Musical Tragedies
- Producer: Hullabaloo

Hullabaloo chronology
| United Colors of Hullabaloo (1992) | Regurgitator (1993) | Bruiser (1994) |

It's Not Enough to be Loud, You Have to Suck to. is the debut recording of Hullabaloo, released through their own Gawdawful Records label in 1988. According to an anecdote on the band's Facebook page, the misspelling of the final "to" in the title is intentional; the title comes from an epithet written on the wall of the bathroom in the band's practice space. The band assumed this was directed at them, as their practice room was adjacent to the bathroom. They copied the graffito verbatim and used it as the title for the EP.

The band clearly emerges from the post-hardcore scene inhabited by such bands as Killdozer, Scratch Acid and the Butthole Surfers. They experiment with unusual instrumentation—distorted amplified trumpet, saxophone, and Wurlitzer electric piano are present here—and unusual song forms.

Regurgitator is the CD reissue of It's Not Enough to be Loud... It was released in 1993 by Musical Tragedies. In addition to the six tracks on It's Not Enough to be Loud... it includes several unreleased studio tracks recorded around the same time, and covers of In the Dark by Toots and the Maytals, Breaking the Law by Judas Priest, Hole Lotta Rosie by AC/DC and a live recording of New York Groove made famous by Ace Frehley. While the unreleased tracks are not as complete or polished as the others, they show further experimentation with unusual instrumentation, song forms and time. Regurgitator specific tracks are listed as such below.

== Critical reception ==
"Atonal cacophony the permeate a brooding, post-punkish structure, with such inspirations as Killdozer, Flipper and The Stooges hovering over, yet this glorious explosion is hardly what I'd call derivative..." – Suburban Voice

"Now here is one of the what I truly consider truly consider to be one of the best rock 'n roll records I have heard in quite a while." – Chemical Castration

"Real moments of musical entropy here..." – XXX Fanzine

"As much as I hate doing this to someone as good and original, if you like KILLDOZER and THE BUTTHOLE SURFERS, check these guys out." – Maximum Rocknroll

"This stuff sucks just fine, thanks." – Option Magazine

"Chow time, dickweed." – Forced Exposure

== Track listing ==
All tracks are written by Hullabaloo, except lyrics on 280 from a poem by Emily Dickinson.

Scrotal Side
| No. | Title | Length |
|---|---|---|
| 1. | "Mother's Car of Jesus" | 4:33 |
| 2. | "280" (lyrics from poem number 280 by Emily Dickinson) | 2:44 |
| 3. | "Dick/Fist" | 4:29 |

Piss and Moan Side
| No. | Title | Length |
|---|---|---|
| 4. | "Dumpster Fire" | 4:14 |
| 5. | "Big as Alaska" | 2:51 |
| 6. | "Paco Goes to Town" | 3:29 |

=== Regurgitator additional tracks ===
All tracks are written by Hullabaloo, except where noted.

| No. | Title | Writer(s) | Length |
|---|---|---|---|
| 7. | "Nail Gun" | | 1:31 |
| 8. | "Growing Up Soggy" | | 2:07 |
| 9. | "Liver & Onions" | | 3:38 |
| 10. | "The Quiet American" | | 2:57 |
| 11. | "Lead" | | 1:42 |
| 12. | "In The Dark" | F. Hibbert, E. Chin | 2:12 |
| 13. | "Breaking the Law" (originally released on Suffer This: A Compilation of Boston's Backwash) | Rob Halford, K. K. Downing, Glenn Tipton | 2:25 |
| 14. | "Hole Lotta Rosie" (originally released as a cassette only bonus track on Beat Until Stiff) | Angus Young, Malcolm Young, Bon Scott | 3:34 |
| 15. | "New York Groove" (recorded live at The Rat in Boston, MA 9/18/1987) | Russ Ballard | 3:13 |

== Personnel as listed on It's Not Enough to be Loud ==
Hullabaloo

- Tango Quebec - Hands and Mouth
- Delta Charlie - Guitar Salad Sandwich & Larynx
- Juno Quebec - Deadweight
- Papa Foxtrot - Nougat Base

Engineering and Additional Personnel

- Jeff Landrock - Engineer
- Harry Brown II - Engineer
- J.J. Gonson - photography

== Personnel and Credits as listed on Regurgitator ==
- Tom Quinn Jr - Vocals on 2,6,13,14,15; All Horns; All Keyboards
- Sluggo - Vocals on 1,3,4,5,7,8,9,11,12; Guitar
- John Quinn - All Drums
- Pete Foley - Bass on 1,2,3,6,7,9,13,14; Lead Guitar on 9
- Lloyd Dyson - Bass on 4,5,10,11,12,15; Vocals on 10

Engineering and additional personnel

- Jeff Landrock - Engineer
- Harry Brown II - Engineer
- J.J. Gonson - photography
- Sluggo - design
- Edwin DeShazo - Mixing, tracks 7,8,9,12,13,14
- Granny - Engineer, track 15
