= Jerry's Kids =

Jerry's Kids may refer to:

- Children assisted by the Muscular Dystrophy Association are referred to as Jerry's Kids
- Jerry's Kids (band), one of the earliest Boston hardcore bands
- "Jerry's Kids", a song by punk group Sloppy Seconds, on the EP The First Seven Inches
