= Lubritorium =

Studio album by Hullabaloo
- Released: 1991
- Recorded: by Lou Giordano at Fort Apache South in October 1990
- Genre: punk rock, post hardcore, grunge
- Label: C/Z
- Producer: Lou Giordano

Hullabaloo chronology
Dead Serious (1990)	Lubritorium (1991)	United Colors of Hullabaloo (1992)

Lubritorium is the fourth release and second full-length album by Hullabaloo. It was released in 1991 on C/Z Records.

Lubritorium was recorded after an aborted tour that took them through some apparently tough times in Canada—as evidenced by their song "Blow me Fucking Canada." The band returns to a quartet format here, with Sluggo on bass and John back behind the drum kit. This was the final appearance of Sluggo in the band before moving to San Francisco, though he is rejoining the band for a reunion in 2014.

This record features five new original songs, plus re-recordings of three older songs. The older songs had remained in their live repertoire over the years; the new versions represent the evolution of the songs through the changing lineups. There is a reggae cover of Kiss's Calling Dr. Love; the band had previously released a straight version of the song on C/Z's Hard to Believe: Kiss Covers Compilation. The record also has three tracks marked "Filler #1–3"; see notes below.

This is the third of their records recorded at the legendary Fort Apache Studios, this time with Lou Giordano behind the controls instead of Paul Kolderie.

The cover art is a painting by Slaughter Shack singer and artist Colin Burns.

== Track listing ==
All tracks are written by Hullabaloo, except where noted.

Side one
No.	Title	Length
1.	"Filler No. 1" (see note †)	0:56
2.	"Lubritorium"	4:04
3.	"Bone of Contention"	3:29
4.	"Filler No. 2" (see note ‡)	1:11
5.	"The Lickyerbutt Song"	1:42
6.	"Washington's Cock"	4:52

Side two
No.	Title	Writer(s)	Length
7.	"Suicidal Maniac"		2:24
8.	"Blow Me Fucking Canada"		3:58
9.	"Loadstar"		4:07
10.	"Retardo Porn"		2:20
11.	"Filler No. 3" (see note ‡)		0:58
12.	"Jah Luv" (reggae version of Calling Dr. Love by Kiss)	Gene Simmons	2:54

=== Notes ===
† Filler No. 1 is an uncredited excerpt from the movie Harold and Maude.
‡ Filler No. 2 and No. 3 are excerpts from a live recording at WBRS in April 1990, engineered by Hillel Cooperman and Wendy Shlensky.

== Personnel ==
The Hullabaloo Show

- Funkmaster Jam - Vocals, Trumpet
- DJ Kevy Kev - Guitars, B. Vocals
- Jammaster Funk - Drums, B. Vocals
- E=MC Squared - Bass, B. Vocals
- Over E-Z - Roadie, Makeup

Technical Personnel

- Lou Giordano - Engineer
- Colin Burns - Painting
