= Paranormalized =

Studio album by Six Finger Satellite
- Released: August 6, 1996
- Recorded: April 1996 at The Parlour, Pawtucket, Rhode Island
- Genre: Noise rock
- Length: 33:18
- Label: Sub Pop
- Producer: Six Finger Satellite

Six Finger Satellite chronology
| Clone Theory (1996) | Paranormalized (1996) | Law of Ruins (1998) |

Professional ratings
Review scores
| Source | Rating |
|---|---|
| AllMusic | 4/5 stars |
| Entertainment Weekly | A− |
| Q | 3/5 stars |

Paranormalized is the third album by Six Finger Satellite, released on August 6, 1996 through Sub Pop. It was marked by an almost complete reliance on synthesizers, in contrast to their earlier records, in which guitars still played a significant part.

The record was recorded at The Parlour, in Pawtucket, Rhode Island, less than a year after the release of Severe Exposure. Singer J. Ryan would later explain, "That record was put together pretty quick just as an attempt to get back on the road. Our touring for Severe Exposure had been pretty spotty."

== Track listing ==
All tracks are written by Six Finger Satellite.

| No. | Title | Length |
|---|---|---|
| 1. | "30 Lashes" | 2:25 |
| 2. | "The Greatest Hit" | 2:51 |
| 3. | "Do the Suicide" | 2:40 |
| 4. | "Coke and Mirrors" | 4:21 |
| 5. | "Last Transmission" | 1:32 |
| 6. | "Slave Traitor" | 4:47 |
| 7. | "The White Shadow" | 2:38 |
| 8. | "Paralyzed by Normal Life" | 2:31 |
| 9. | "Padded Room" | 3:18 |
| 10. | "Perico" | 3:07 |
| 11. | "The Great Depression" | 3:08 |

== Personnel ==
Six Finger Satellite

- James Apt – bass guitar, clarinet
- John MacLean – guitar, synthesizer, Moog synthesizer
- Richard Ivan Pelletier – drums, drum machine
- Jeremiah Ryan – vocals, Moog synthesizer

Additional musicians and production

- Peter Goldberg – photography
- John Golden – mastering
- Jeff Kleinsmith – design
- Nate Pellochoud – photography
- Charles Peterson – photography
- Six Finger Satellite – production, engineering, mixing
