= Weapon (comics) =

Weapon, in comics, may refer to:

- The Weapon (comics), a series from Platinum Comics written by Fred Van Lente
- Weapon (DC Comics), a DC Comics character
- Weapon Alpha (comics), a Marvel Comics character better known as the Guardian
- Weapon Omega, an alias used by the Marvel Comics character Michael Pointer
- Weapon Plus, a clandestine program in the Marvel Universe designed to create superhumans
- Weapon X, part of the Weapon Plus program
- Weapon Zero, two titles by the Image Comics imprint Top Cow

It may also refer to:

- Weapons of the Gods (comics) a Hong Kong comics series
- Weaponers of Qward, a group in the DC Comics Universe, enemies of the Green Lantern Corps

== See also ==
- Weapon (disambiguation)
