= Half Control =

Studio album by Six Finger Satellite
- Released: May 26, 2009
- Recorded: 2001 at The Parlour, Pawtucket, Rhode Island
- Genre: Noise rock
- Length: 30:28
- Label: Load

Six Finger Satellite chronology
Law of Ruins (1998)	Half Control (2009)	A Good Year for Hardness (2009)

Professional ratings
Review scores
Source	Rating
Allmusic	3.5/5 stars

Half Control is the fifth album by Six Finger Satellite, released on May 26, 2009 through Load Records. It comprises material the band recorded in 2001 before disbanding shortly after.

== Track listing ==
All tracks are written by Six Finger Satellite.

No.	Title	Length
1.	"Thrown Out"	1:55
2.	"Herpe Gimme Strength"	2:05
3.	"Artificial Light"	5:13
4.	"Half Control"	5:01
5.	"A Tighter Passage"	2:18
6.	"Live Legs"	4:07
7.	"Long Time No C"	2:01
8.	"Bored Oracle"	7:46

== Personnel ==
Six Finger Satellite

- Shawn Greenlee – bass guitar
- Joel Kyack – guitar
- Richard Ivan Pelletier – drums
- Jeremiah Ryan – vocals, synthesizer

Additional musicians and production

- Jeff Lipton – mastering
- Seth Manchester – mixing
- Dare Matheson – cover art
- Six Finger Satellite – mixing, recording
- Keith Souza – mixing
