= The Palladium Book of Contemporary Weapons =

Role-playing game supplement

- Cover art by Kevin Siembieda
- Designers: Maryann Siembieda
- Illustrators: Kevin Siembieda
- Publishers: Palladium Books
- Publication: 1984
- Genres: Modern combat RPG

The Palladium Book of Contemporary Weapons is a supplement published by Palladium Books in 1984 for use in military or combat-oriented role-playing games set from World War II to the Cold War of the 1980s.

== Contents ==
The Palladium Book of Contemporary Weapons is a compendium of popular firearms from the 1930s to the early 1980s, and is organized into the categories of Automatic Pistols, Sub-Machine Guns, Rifles, Shotguns, and Machine Guns. Information about each weapon is given including ammunition used, penetrating power, tissue damage, and range. A line drawing of each weapon is also shown.

== Publication history ==
Palladium produced a number of "weapons" books in the early 1980s, including The Palladium Book of Weapons & Castles (1982) and The Palladium Book of Weapons and Castles of the Orient (1984). The Palladium Book of Contemporary Weapons, a digest-sized book created by Maryann Siembieda, with artwork by Kevin Siembieda, was released in 1984.

== Reception ==
In Issue 30 of Abyss (Summer 1984), Carl Jones pointed out "What is lacking in these brief mechanics is any real analysis of trauma." Jones thought the choice of line drawings over photographs was "wise, and is far superior." Jones wished that the book contained a cross-indexed chart of each type of weapon for easy reference, noting "This would make the material a bit more accessible." Jones concluded, "Certainly worth checking out for modern-period role-players." Six years later, in Issue 46 of Abyss (Summer 1990), Charles Hardin disagreed, calling this book "badly laid out and horribly inaccurate, with practically no redeeming features whatsoever." Hardin pointed out problems with unrealistic ratings for various types of ammunition, and suggested that effective ranges had been assigned randomly. In one example he pointed out the range given for a Steyr AUG assault rifle was 800 meters, but the range given for a Lee Enfield Enforcer sniper rifle was only 300 meters. Hardin also pointed out many inaccuracies with the line drawings of the weapons. In summary, Hardin called this "an unsatisfactory attempt at producing a game-oriented description of modern firearms. There is a need for one, but the blatant inaccuracies in this work make it useless for any purpose, for anyone."

In Issue 70 of Space Gamer, Jerry Epperson commented "If you have no interest in modern RPGs, obviously Contemporary Weapons will be of little interest to you. However, if you are looking to expand the firearm variety in your game, this aid is right on target."

In Issue 39 of Different Worlds, William A. Barton noted "for those whose interest in firearms is limited to what a select few look like and just enough data on them to use them in play, and who, therefore, wouldn't require the more extensive (and more than twice as expensive) works such as The Armory, Palladium's excursion into the field of firearms could be sufficient for most uses, in spite of its limitations. And for those with very limited budgets, or who play Palladium systems, Contemporary Weapons might even be ideal."
