= Green Magnet School =

Experimental rock band formed in Massachusetts

- Origin: Framingham, Massachusetts, United States
- Genres: Noise rock, post-punk, industrial, post-hardcore
- Years active: 1987–1997, 2014
- Labels: Sub Pop, Genius, Sonic Bubblegum, Hippy Knight, Toxic Shock
- Past members: See below
- Website: greenmagnetschool.bandcamp

Green Magnet School was an experimental rock band formed in Massachusetts during 1987. They released three albums in the 1990s, one of which appeared on the prominent independent label Sub Pop Records (1991's Blood Music). They disbanded in 1997, but briefly reunited in 2014.

== History ==
Green Magnet School was founded in the city of Framingham, Massachusetts. The initial lineup of the band consisted of vocalist/guitarist Chris Pearson, guitarist/vocalist Tim Shea, guitarist/bassist Can Keskin, bassist Steve Rzucidlo, and drummer Craig Duhamel. The fivesome recorded a demo EP titled The Penguin Tape in 1987, and they self-distributed it throughout the local Boston music scene. Their sound was experimental overall, but had traces of genres such as industrial rock, post-hardcore, noise rock, and post-punk. In particular, Pearson was the primary vocalist and Keskin alternated between guitar and second bass. By the following year, Duhamel was replaced on drums by Rob Hamilton. Their first commercialized release was a split-single with God's Acre (formed by drummer Brian St. Clair) on the label Toxic Shock Records in early 1990.

In 1991, Green Magnet School was signed by Sub Pop Records, an independent label who was known for their role in the grunge movement. The label initially released the "Singed" single via the Sub Pop Singles Club. The band then worked in the studio with producer Sean Slade. Towards the end of the year, Green Magnet School's full-length debut album was released overseas, entitled Blood Music. It was given a proper release in the United States by February 1992. The album's name was taken from the 1985 novel of the same name by Greg Bear. Blood Music received praise from various outlets, and the band was compared favorably to Killing Joke, Sonic Youth, Gang of Four, Dinosaur Jr., among others. Visions Magazine (a publication in Germany) singled out Blood Music in its "Top 100 Albums 1991–1996" list.

In the summer of 1992, Rzucidlo departed from the band, and he was replaced on bass by Stephen Smith. Green Magnet School then toured on the side stage of Lollapalooza, which was their only appearance at the festival. After the festival concluded in September, Hamilton was replaced on drums by Greg Gilmartin. The band then released a split-single with Six Finger Satellite on Sub Pop (titled The Declaration of Techno-Colonial Independence), which featured the non-album track "Twelve Gauge" and the Neil Young cover "Don't Cry". By the following year, Sub Pop had lost interest in the band due to their expansive yet scattered roster of artists, and Green Magnet School parted ways with the label as a result.

In early 1993, bassist Smith left the band, and he was replaced by Jeff Iwanicki. Green Magnet School regrouped in the studio during the summer of 1993 with producer John Wood. The result was Revisionist, which was released on the independent label Sonic Bubblegum. Around the same time, they also appeared at the CMJ New Music Marathon festival. The band then became mostly inactive throughout 1994, but they reconvened in the studio by the end of the year.

Once again with Wood on production, Green Magnet School released their final album in the summer of 1995, Illuminatus. The album peaked at No. 91 on the CMJ Top 150 chart in July of that year, and it lingered in the chart for a few weeks overall. The band also went on a tour to support the album as they played in regions that they couldn't visit beforehand. By 1997, Green Magnet School disbanded as their members pursued other interests.

Green Magnet School's song "Throb" (from the Blood Music album) appeared on a compilation issued by Visions Magazine in 2008, Sub Pop 20th Anniversary Compilation. In 2014, Green Magnet School's Blood Music album was specifically singled out in the book Gimme Indie Rock: 500 Essential American Underground Rock Albums 1981–1996 by Andre Earles. Also in 2014, the band reunited for a one-off show which celebrated the 25th anniversary of the Boston radio station WMBR. The lineup consisted of Shea, Pearson, Keskin, and Hamilton, in addition to Mike Davis on bass. Around the same time, the band's music was officially uploaded digitally for the first time, which included their long out-of-print demo cassette from 1987, The Penguin Tape.

== Members ==
- Chris Pearson – lead vocals, guitars (1987–1997, 2014)
- Tim Shea – guitars, backing vocals (1987–1997, 2014)
- Can Keskin – guitars, bass (1987–1997, 2014)
- Steve Rzucidlo – bass (1987–1992)
- Craig Duhamel – drums (1987–1988)
- Rob Hamilton – drums (1988–1992, 2014)
- Stephen Smith – bass (1992–1993)
- Greg Gilmartin – drums (1992–1997)
- Jeff Iwanicki – bass (1993–1997)
- Mike Davis – bass (2014)

== Discography ==
=== Albums ===
- Blood Music (1991, Sub Pop Records)
- Revisionist (1993, Sonic Bubblegum)
- Illuminatus (1995, Sonic Bubblegum)

=== Singles ===
- "CO", split with God's Acre (1990, Toxic Shock Records)
- "White People" (1991, Sonic Bubblegum)
- "Singed" (1991, Sub Pop Records)
- The Declaration of Techno-Colonial Independence, split with Six Finger Satellite (1992, Sub Pop Records)
- "White People", split with Six Finger Satellite (1992, Hippy Knight Records)
