= Six Finger Satellite =

American post-hardcore band

- Origin: Providence, Rhode Island, U.S.
- Genres: Post-punk; synth-punk; post-hardcore; noise rock
- Years active: 1988–2001, 2007–present
- Labels: Sub Pop, Load Records
- Members: Jeremiah Ryan; Rick Pelletier; Dan St Jaques; Brian Dufresne
- Past members: Jon Loper; Joel Kyack; Shawn Greenlee; Alex Minoff; John MacLean; James Apt; Kurt Niemand; Peter Phillips; Chris Dixon

Six Finger Satellite (a.k.a. 6FS) is an American rock band from Providence, Rhode Island. Described by former member John MacLean as "a post-punk band utilizing dance music elements", Six Finger Satellite's eclectic sound is driven by synthesizers as well as more traditional rock instrumentation.

== History ==
Six Finger Satellite formed in 1989 around a line-up of J. Ryan (singer/keyboards), John MacLean (guitar), Peter Phillips (guitar), Chris Dixon (bass), and Rick Pelletier (drums).

Sub Pop co-founder Jonathan Poneman witnessed one of the band's earliest out-of-town shows at the New Music Seminar in New York City, and expressed an interest in their music. The band handed him a demo tape, which was released by Sub Pop as the Weapon EP. Contrary to popular belief, Six Finger Satellite did not set out to trick the label by handing in a demo that did not reflect their musical ambitions. According to Ryan:

I wouldn’t necessarily call that demo a hoax in the way people talk about it. If anything, the hoax is that we were already changing after we had submitted it. (...) We were playing those songs live. It wasn’t like we were like, "Oh, let’s spend a bunch of years studying grunge music and try to fool Sub Pop." It was more like we made this music.

Six Finger Satellite's first full-length album, The Pigeon Is the Most Popular Bird, was released in 1993, with Kurt Niemand replacing Dixon on bass. The record more accurately represented the band's vision of noisy, cyborg-esque post-punk, and was recorded by Bob Weston, whose band Shellac named their 1994 single, The Bird is the Most Popular Finger in tribute. In 1994, 6FS released the Machine Cuisine EP, which was recorded entirely with synthesizers, suggesting the band's future direction. Their 7" single supposedly recorded "live at the A.C.I." was not actually recorded live at the Rhode Island Adult Correctional Institute prison, as purported in its tongue-in-cheek liner notes.

In the meantime, Phillips had left the band and Niemand had died of a drug overdose. James Apt joined on bass. Around this time, the band began using their advance money from Sub Pop to buy recording equipment and build their own studio called The Parlour in an industrial space. The band released Severe Exposure, which represented a fusion of their synth- and guitar-driven sounds, in 1995.

Over the course of the next 3 years, the studio underwent a few physical renovations and upgrades in recording gear. The band became adept at recording and Ryan, Pelletier and MacLean were involved in recording projects with local Providence bands; Les Savy Fav, Astoveboat, Landed, Men's Recovery Project, flicker, The Olneyville Soundsystem, to name a few. The low-budget music video for the song "Parlour Games" from Severe Exposure (directed by Guy Benoit of Thee Hydrogen Terrors) was featured in an episode of Beavis and Butt-head.

Paranormalized was a quick follow-up to Severe Exposure, and while it continued in the same sonic vein, the album was decidedly less guitar focused, with more emphasis on layered synthesizers. The touring for this record was much more effective as the band played with Shellac, The Jesus Lizard, and Trans Am and was on the road for most of that year. A few of the songs became live set staples ("Slave Traitor", "The Greatest Hit").

The band's final full-length was Law of Ruins, released in 1998 and produced by James Murphy. It was marked by a spacier sound, and was heavily influenced by Krautrock. The CD came in an entirely clear jewelcase with minimalist neon green graphic design/writing. Murphy had joined as live sound engineer the previous year as the band was increasingly aware of the importance of having its own soundman. Murphy had been recording bands in Brooklyn at Plantain Studios and playing with the band Speedking. The 'death from above" moniker was one that Speedking had appropriated from a US military logo. The band and Murphy mutually influenced each other and the punishing live show took on another sonic dimension with Murphy at the board. MacLean quit the band in late 1998 soon after the release of "Law of Ruins" and was replaced by Alex Minoff from the band Golden for the few tours dates the band had committed to that year. Minoff played live for a second short tour and then the band went on hiatus. In 1999, Ryan and Pelletier reformed the group, replacing Minoff and Apt with Joel Kyack (guitar) and Shawn Greenlee (bass) from the group Landed. This incarnation of the group performed until 2001.

== Reformation ==
The 2008 edition of Six Finger Satellite include longtime members J. Ryan and Rick Pelletier with Dan St. Jaques (Landed/Olneyville Sound System/Thee Hydrogen Terrors/Von Ryan's Express) on bass and Jon Loper (Made in Mexico/La Machine/Ghosts of Waco) on drums. The band announced that a previously unreleased album named Half Control, recorded in 2001, would be released on Load Records with new recording in the summer of 2008. A handful of live dates were announced with the new lineup.

The 2009 edition includes longtime members J. Ryan and Rick Pelletier with Dan St. Jacques and Brian Dufresne.

== Influences and legacy ==
Six Finger Satellite's eclectic sound mixed a wide variety of styles and acts, including Kraftwerk, disco, dub, and Chrome. Early on, John MacLean and Jeremiah Ryan shared such influences as Mission of Burma, Hüsker Dü, and Black Flag.

Six Finger Satellite attracted a significant underground following during the 1990s, and are today recognized for their somewhat prophetic fusion of electronic and post-punk music. In 2005, Jonathan Galkin remarked that "if a band came out today that sounded like Paranormalized, they'd be signed to a huge record deal, sight unseen." Similar bands that existed alongside 6FS in the 1990s included Trans Am, Brainiac, The V.S.S., and The Dismemberment Plan.

J. Ryan, his brother John Ryan, and Dan St. Jacques—Guy Benoit would come into the fold later—formed the spazzy, scuzzy, garage band Von Ryan's Express, named after the 1965 Frank Sinatra movie. He is commonly mistaken for the Chicago-based illustrator and poster artist of the same name. John MacLean has since recorded as The Juan Maclean and Rick Pelletier played in The Chinese Stars and plays in an ongoing dub-esque project called La Machine. James Murphy has gone on to form LCD Soundsystem and DFA Records. The label takes its name from his tour set-up for 6FS, which was known as "death from above."

== Members ==
=== Current members ===
- Jeremiah Ryan – lead vocals, keyboards (1988–2001, 2007–present)
- Rick Pelletier – drums (1988–2001); guitars (2007–present)
- Dan St. Jaques – bass (2007–present)
- Brian Dufresne – drums (2009–present)

=== Former members ===
- John MacLean – guitars, keyboards (1988–1998)
- Peter Phillips – guitars, backing vocals (1988–1994); died 2015
- Chris Dixon – bass (1988–1992)
- Kurt Niemand – bass (1992–1994); died 1995
- James Apt – bass, backing vocals (1994–1999)
- Alex Minoff – guitars (1998–1999)
- Joel Kyack – guitars (1999–2001)
- Shawn Greenlee – bass (1999–2001)
- Jon Loper – drums (2007–2009)

=== Timeline ===
Color denotes main live duty

== Discography ==
=== Albums ===
Year	Album details
1993	The Pigeon Is the Most Popular Bird: Released: July 1, 1993; Label: Sub Pop (#215); Format: 2x12", CD
1995	Severe Exposure: Released: June 13, 1995; Label: Sub Pop (#299); Format: LP, CD
1996	Paranormalized: Released: August 6, 1996; Label: Sub Pop (#366); Format: LP, CD
1998	Law of Ruins: Released: August 11, 1998; Label: Sub Pop (#428); Format: 2xLP, CD
2009	Half Control: Recorded: 2001; Released: May 26, 2009; Label: Load (#125); Format: LP, CD
2009	A Good Year For Hardness: Released: October 20, 2009; Label: Anchor Brain (#002); Format: LP, CD-R, Digital Download

=== EPs ===
Year	EP details
1992	Weapon: Released: March 1, 1992; Label: Sub Pop (#143); Format: 12", CD
1994	Machine Cuisine: Released: August 9, 1994; Label: Sub Pop (#261); Format: 10"
1994	Machine Cuisine Companion Cassette: Released: August 9, 1994; Label: Self-Released; Format: Cassette
1996	Clone Theory: Released: June 28, 1996; Label: Load (#008); Format: 12"

=== Singles ===
Year	Single details
1992	"Weapon": Notes: Split w/ Green Magnet School; Released: 1992; Label: Hippy Knight (#011); Format: 7"
1993	"Declaration Of Techno-Colonial Independence": Notes: Split w/ Green Magnet School; Released: 1993; Label: Sub Pop (#172); Format: 2x7", CDEP
1995	"Rabies (Baby's Got The)" / "Mistaken Street" / "Swing Alone": Notes: Bonus white-label 12" for Severe Exposure LP; Released: July 13, 1995; Label: Sub Pop (#299D); Format: 12"
1996	"Massive Cocaine Seizure" b/w "Human Operator": Released: March 12, 1996; Label: Sub Pop (#327); Format: 7"
1996	"Live At The A.C.I. - Man Behind The Glasses + 2": Released: July 23, 1996; Label: Sub Pop (#362); Format: 7"
1999	"Fuzzy Logic" b/w "20 Questions": Notes: Gun Court Singles Series; Released: 1999; Label: Wabana Ore (#18); Format: 7"

=== Compilations ===
- Revolution Come and Gone ("Weapon") (1992, Sub Pop)
- Altered States of America ("Funny Like a Clown") (1993, Lime Lizard)
- Curtis W. Pitts: Sub Pop Employee of the Month ("Funny Like a Clown") (1993, Sub Pop)
- Say "Hello" to the Far East ("Solitary Hiro") (1993, Sub Pop Japan)
- A Bitter Pill to Swallow: A Providence Music Sampler ("Whitepower") (1994, Over the Counter)
- That Virtua Feeling: Sub Pop and Sega Get Together ("Parlour Games") (1995, Sub Pop)
- Chicken Bomb ("Parlour Games" (live)) (1996, Boring Theoretical Productions)
- Felidae: A Benefit for the Cedarhill Animal Sanctuary ("E.V. 635") (1997, Last Exit)
- Spring Lineup: A Compilation of Sub Pop's Heavy Hitters ("Coke and Mirrors") (1997, Sub Pop)
- The Money Shot! ("Fisher of Kings") (1997, Chunklet)
- To All the URL's I've Loved ("Spooks / So Lonely") (1997, Sick & Tired)
- untitled 7" with Carbon 14 magazine #9 ("Unit 6") (1997, Carbon 14)
- Sound: Check ("Race Against Space") (1998, Sub Pop)
- False Object Sensor ("The Pain Has Gone Away") (2001, Vermiform/X-Mist)

=== Other appearances ===
- Fred Schneider - Just Fred (backing band on "Bad Dream") (1996, Warner Bros.)
