= The Emerson Theater =

Music venue in Indianapolis, Indiana, US

Emerson Theater
- The Emerson
- Interactive map of Emerson Theater
- Former names: Eastland Theater (1928-1931)
- Address: 4630 E 10th St; Indianapolis, Indiana; United States
- Coordinates: 39.781642°N 86.090874°W

Construction
- Opened: 1928

Website
- www.emersontheater.com

The Emerson Theater is an all age music venue located in the Little Flower neighborhood of Indianapolis, Indiana. It was opened on December 11, 1927, as a one-screen movie theater under the name Eastland Theater. It was later reopened under new management and renamed to Emerson Theater on October 7, 1930. It has since been renovated to operate as a music venue with the seats being removed and a stage built in and has hosted hundreds of shows over the years. As of 2021, the 400 person venue hosts local music acts on Friday and Saturday nights and occasionally regional or national acts throughout the week.

On January 18, 2019, a previous Emerson Theater owner announced on social media that the venue was relocating to a location on the west side of Indianapolis and would be renamed The Citadel Music Hall. The building was subsequently vacant until reopening under new ownership in early 2020.

== Recording history ==
The album Live: No Time for Tuning by Indianapolis junk rock band Sloppy Seconds was recorded at the Emerson Theatre on April 15, 1995.

== See also ==
- List of attractions and events in Indianapolis
