= Law of Ruins =

Studio album by Six Finger Satellite
- Released: August 11, 1998
- Recorded: January and February 1998 at The Parlour, Pawtucket, Rhode Island
- Genres: Noise rock, post-rock
- Length: 66:00
- Label: Sub Pop
- Producers: James Murphy, Six Finger Satellite

Six Finger Satellite chronology
Paranormalized (1996)	Law of Ruins (1998)	Half Control (2009)

Professional ratings
Review scores
Source	Rating
AllMusic	4/5 stars
Pitchfork	9.4/10

Law of Ruins is an album by the American noise rock band Six Finger Satellite. It was released in 1998 through Sub Pop.

== Critical reception ==
The Palm Beach Post wrote: "Armed with Moogs and electronic effects, paying homage to Devo, Kraftwerk and electronica, and not afraid to cut lyrically incomprehensible, relentlessly driving songs that clock in at over 10 minutes, 6FS is not for the faint of heart or easily disturbed."

== Track listing ==
All tracks are written by Six Finger Satellite.

No.	Title	Length
1.	"Race Against Space"	5:06
2.	"Surveillance House"	5:24
3.	"Fall to Pieces"	7:33
4.	"Sea of Tranquility, Parts 1 & 2"	11:46
5.	"Law of Ruins"	3:33
6.	"Lonely Grave"	5:30
7.	"New Kind of Rat"	5:01
8.	"The White Visitation"	6:43
9.	"Bad Aptitude"	3:35
10.	"Fur Immer Liebe"	7:53
11.	"Hertz So Good"	4:00

== Personnel ==
Six Finger Satellite

- James Apt – bass guitar, clarinet
- John MacLean – guitar, synthesizer
- Richard Ivan Pelletier – drums, drum machine
- Jeremiah Ryan – vocals, Moog synthesizer

Additional musicians and production

- Alan Douches – mastering
- Jeff Kleinsmith – design
- James Murphy – production, engineering, mixing
- Six Finger Satellite – production, engineering, mixing
