= The Weapon =

The Weapon may refer to:

- The Weapon (album), a 1973 album by David Newman
- The Weapon (comics), a 2007 comic book mini-series by Fred Van Lante
- The Weapon (1956 film), a British thriller film
- The Weapon (2023 film), an American action thriller film
- The Weapon (game), a play-by-mail game of space-based combat
- "The Weapon", a song by Rush from the 1982 album Signals
- The Weapon, a 2005 novel by Michael Z. Williamson

== See also ==
- Weapon (disambiguation)
