= The Pigeon Is the Most Popular Bird =

Studio album by Six Finger Satellite
- Released: August 24, 1993
- Genre: Noise rock, post-hardcore
- Length: 66:12
- Label: Sub Pop

Six Finger Satellite chronology
Weapon (1991)	The Pigeon Is the Most Popular Bird (1993)	Machine Cuisine (1994)

Professional ratings
Review scores
Source	Rating
AllMusic	3/5 stars

The Pigeon Is the Most Popular Bird is the debut studio album of the noise rock band Six Finger Satellite, released in 1993 through Sub Pop.

== Critical reception ==
The Seattle Times wrote that the band "create an intelligent (and radio-unfriendly) hybrid of conventional musical styles, sheer noise and structural deftness." Pitchfork called The Pigeon Is the Most Popular Bird "one of the best noise-rock records of the 90s," writing that "the transitions from silly to searing highlight SFS' unpredictable and caustic approach."

== Track listing ==
No.	Title	Length
1.	"[untitled]"	0:37
2.	"Home for the Holy Day"	2:50
3.	"[untitled]"	0:48
4.	"Laughing Larry"	5:11
5.	"[untitled]"	1:31
6.	"Funny Like a Clown"	3:33
7.	"[untitled]"	1:42
8.	"Deadpan"	4:54
9.	"[untitled]"	0:59
10.	"Hi-Lo Jerk"	4:03
11.	"[untitled]"	2:18
12.	"Love (Via Satellite)"	3:17
13.	"[untitled]"	1:03
14.	"Save the Last Dance for Larry"	4:24
15.	"[untitled]"	0:39
16.	"Solitary Hiro"	2:19
17.	"[untitled]"	1:38
18.	"Neuro-Harmonic Conspiracy"	5:11
19.	"[untitled]"	1:34
20.	"Takes One to Know One"	3:34
21.	"[untitled]"	13:55

== Personnel ==
Six Finger Satellite

- John MacLean – guitar, moog synthesizer, organ
- Kurt Niemand – bass guitar
- Richard D. Pelletier – drums
- Peter Phillips – guitar, vocals
- Jeremiah Ryan – vocals

Additional musicians and production

- Laura Borealis (Laura Hyde Crapo) – photography
- John Golden – mastering
- Marcellus Hall – harmonica (Tracks 10)
- Robert Weston – engineering
