= The First Seven Inches =

EP by Sloppy Seconds
- Released: 1987
- Genre: Punk rock
- Label: Alternative Testicles

Sloppy Seconds chronology
The First Seven Inches (1987)	Destroyed (1990)

The First Seven Inches is the first EP released by punk band Sloppy Seconds. It was released in 1987 on the band's own Alternative Testicles label. In 1992, it was reissued on Taang! Records under the title The First Seven Inches...And Then Some! along with 10 bonus tracks of various b-sides and outtakes from the band's first two albums and prior. The CD release included the Misfits cover "Where Eagles Dare." For the album's 1999 reissue, the band's Lonely Christmas EP is included as a bonus disk.

== Track listing ==
All music is composed by Sloppy Seconds.

No.	Title	Length
1.	"So Fucked Up"	2:31
2.	"Lynchtown U.S.A."	1:50
3.	"If I Had a Woman"	3:03
4.	"Someone Else's Pills"	2:05

The First Seven Inches...And Then Some! bonus tracks
No.	Title	Writer(s)	Length
5.	"Public Beat"		2:17
6.	"Leavin' on a Jet Plane"	John Denver	2:32
7.	"Vacation"	Charlotte Caffey, Jane Wiedlin, Kathy Valentine	2:37
8.	"Yuppies"		2:57
9.	"Germany"		2:31
10.	"The Men"		1:36
11.	"I Don't Wanna Take You Home"		1:26
12.	"Human Waste"		2:22
13.	"Jerry's Kids"		2:21
14.	"The Pop My Dick Song"		0:16
15.	"Where Eagles Dare" (Featured on CD release)	Glenn Danzig	2:39

=== Notes ===
- Tracks 9–11 first appeared on the compilation, Black Brittle Frisbee, as well the Germany EP.
- Track 6 was a B-side to "Come Back, Traci" (also included on some pressings of Destroyed.
- Track 15 was a non-LP single.
- Track 13 first appeared on the compilation, There's A Method To Our Madness in 1986.
- Tracks 1, 3, 9, and 11 were later re-recorded for the band's debut LP, Destroyed.

== Credits ==
- B.A. - noise, producer
- Steve Sloppy - drums, producer
- Shazam Bo'Bajam - bass, producer
- Danny Roadkill - guitar, producer
- Bobby Steele - guest guitar & vocals on Where Eagles Dare
- Curtis - executive producer
- Mike Kreffel - artwork
- Lee Cuthbert - engineer
- Jim - engineer
