= Machine Cuisine =

EP by Six Finger Satellite
- Released: August 23, 1994
- Genre: Noise rock
- Length: 27:39
- Label: Sub Pop
- Producer: Six Finger Satellite

Six Finger Satellite chronology
The Pigeon Is the Most Popular Bird (1993)	Machine Cuisine (1994)	Severe Exposure (1995)

Professional ratings
Review scores
Source	Rating
Allmusic	3/5 stars

Machine Cuisine is an EP by Six Finger Satellite, released on August 23, 1994, through Sub Pop. It was the band's first release as a trio, as previous bassist Kurt Niemand and guitarist Peter Phillips both departed from the band earlier in the year.

== Track listing ==
All tracks are written by Six Finger Satellite.

Side one
No.	Title	Length
1.	"Love (Via Machine)"	2:19
2.	"Blue Melodica"	0:47
3.	"The Magic Bus"	2:14
4.	"Hans Pocketwatch"	7:28

Side two
No.	Title	Length
1.	"The Well-Tempered Monkey"	4:21
2.	"Like to Get to Know You"	3:15
3.	"The Greek Arts"	0:41
4.	"White Temples"	6:34

== Personnel ==
Six Finger Satellite

- John MacLean – guitar, moog synthesizer, organ
- Richard D. Pelletier – drums
- Jeremiah Ryan – vocals
