= Clone Theory =

EP by Six Finger Satellite
- Released: June 28, 1996
- Recorded: February and March 1996 at The Parlour, Pawtucket, Rhode Island
- Genre: Noise rock
- Label: Load
- Producer: Six Finger Satellite

Six Finger Satellite chronology
| Severe Exposure (1995) | Clone Theory (1996) | Paranormalized (1996) |

Professional ratings
Review scores
| Source | Rating |
|---|---|
| Allmusic | 3/5 stars |

Clone Theory is an EP by Six Finger Satellite, released on June 28, 1996, through Load Records.

== Track listing ==
All tracks are written by Six Finger Satellite.

Side one
| No. | Title | Length |
|---|---|---|
| 1. | "Send in the Clones" |
| 2. | "Ich Weil Nacht" |
| 3. | "War Crimes III" |

Side two
| No. | Title | Length |
|---|---|---|
| 1. | "Slave Trader" |
| 2. | "Valley of the Monkey God" |
| 3. | "War Crimes II" |
| 4. | "Glassy Eyes" |
| 5. | "I Want Night (It Ends Tomorrow)" |

== Personnel ==
Six Finger Satellite

- James Apt – bass guitar, clarinet, additional vocals
- John MacLean – guitar, synthesizer
- Richard Ivan Pelletier – drums, drum machine
- Jeremiah Ryan – vocals, Moog synthesizer
