= Destroyed (Sloppy Seconds album) =

Studio album by Sloppy Seconds
- Released: 1989
- Recorded: 1988 – 1989 at Diehl Production Studios in Carmel
- Genre: Punk rock
- Label: Toxic Shock
- Producer: Paul Mahern and Sloppy Seconds

Sloppy Seconds chronology
Destroyed (1989)	Knock Yer Block Off (1993)

Singles from Destroyed
- 1. "Come Back, Traci" Released: 1989; 2. "I Don't Wanna Be a Homosexual" Released: 1990

Destroyed is the first full-length studio album by punk band Sloppy Seconds. It was released by Toxic Shock Records, on LP and cassette, and co-released on CD by the Musical Tragedies label in Germany, both in 1989.

The album was reissued on Metal Blade (CD and cassette) in the UK and US and Metal Mind in Poland (cassette) in 1994, Last Resort Records (picture disc LP) in 1995, Coldfront Records (CD) on October 15, 2002, Kid Tested Records (CD, double LP) in 2009 to commemorate the album's 20th anniversary, and D-Tour (LP) in 2018. The album cover is a parody of the Kiss album Destroyer, from 1976.

== Track listing ==
All songs written by Sloppy Seconds unless indicated.

=== Toxic Shock, Last Resort and D-Tour releases ===
Side A
No.	Title	Writer(s)	Length
1.	"I Don't Wanna be a Homosexual"	Danny Thompson, Steve Childers	5:04
2.	"Come Back Traci"		2:03
3.	"Take You Home"		1:23
4.	"Black Roses"		2:22
5.	"Runnin' from the CIA"		2:01
6.	"The Horror of Party Beach"		2:08
7.	"Black Mail"		2:49
8.	"So Fucked Up"		2:33

Side 1
No.	Title	Writer(s)	Length
9.	"Germany"		2:19
10.	"Janie is a Nazi"		2:36
11.	"I Want 'Em Dead"		3:32
12.	"If I Had a Woman"		2:53
13.	"Veronica"		2:42
14.	"The Candy Man"	Leslie Bricusse, Anthony Newley	1:34
15.	"Steal Your Beer"		1:40
16.	"Time Bomb"		1:42

Metal Blade CD/cassette and Metal Mind cassette bonus track
No.	Title	Writer(s)	Length
17.	"Serious"	Alice Cooper, David Foster, Steve Lukather, Bernie Taupin	2:14

=== Toxic Shock/Musical Tragedies CD ===
No.	Title	Writer(s)	Length
1.	"I Don't Wanna be a Homosexual"	Danny Thompson, Steve Childers	5:04
2.	"Come Back Traci"		2:03
3.	"Take You Home"		1:23
4.	"Black Roses"		2:22
5.	"Runnin' from the CIA"		2:01
6.	"The Horror of Party Beach"		2:08
7.	"Black Mail"		2:49
8.	"So Fucked Up"		2:33
9.	"Leavin' on a Jet Plane"	John Denver	2:32
10.	"Germany"		2:19
11.	"Janie is a Nazi"		2:36
12.	"I Want 'Em Dead"		3:32
13.	"If I Had a Woman"		2:53
14.	"Veronica"		2:42
15.	"The Candy Man"	Leslie Bricusse, Anthony Newley	1:34
16.	"Steal Your Beer"		1:40
17.	"Time Bomb"		1:42

Coldfront CD bonus tracks
No.	Title	Writer(s)	Length
18.	"Human Waste"		2:24
19.	"Conned Again"	Steve Jones, Paul Cook	2:19
20.	"Hooray for Santa Claus"	Milton DeLugg, Roy Alfred	1:40
21.	"Serious"	Alice Cooper, David Foster, Steve Lukather, Bernie Taupin	2:16

Kid Tested 20th Anniversary Edition CD bonus tracks
No.	Title	Length
18.	"Don's Guns"	3:23
19.	"Before We Had Cable"	1:48
20.	"Playin' with Poison"	2:08
21.	"The Horror of Party Beach" (demo)	2:13
22.	"Witness"	2:14
23.	"Woman from Babylon"	2:22
24.	"Livin' in the Shadows"	3:08
25.	"Pubic Beat" (rehearsal)	2:16
26.	"Somewhere in the Seventies"	1:57
27.	"Human Waste" (acoustic)	2:23

The LP editions of this re-release include the above tracks on an extra, single-sided LP (with an etching on the other side), but do not include "Leavin' on a Jet Plane."

== Personnel ==
- B.A. – yells, producer
- Steve Sloppy – drums, producer
- Bo'Ba Jam – bass, producer
- Dr. Roadkill – guitar, producer
- Paul Mahern – producer, engineer
- Mike Kreffel – artwork, cover art, pre-press layout
- Rob Perkins – background vocals, photography, road crew
- Paul Bohall – background vocals, road crew, bus repair technician
- Craig "R.V." Croomes – background vocals
- Jeff Masengale – background vocals, photography
- Scott Turns – background vocals, road crew
- John Barron – road crew

== Trivia ==
- "Leavin' On A Jet Plane" is taken from the "Come Back Traci" single (1989).
- "Serious" is taken from the compilation Welcome To Our Nightmare: A Tribute To Alice Cooper (1993).
- "Human Waste" is taken from the "I Don't Wanna Be A Homosexual" single (1990).
- "Conned Again" and "Hooray for Santa Claus" are taken from the Lonely Christmas EP (1992).
- "Don's Guns" is taken from The Shot Heard Around The World compilation (1986).
- "Before Cable" (renamed "Before We Had Cable") is taken from War Between The States: North compilation (1989).
- On the cover, Steve Sloppy is wearing a Misfits shirt.
- The song "I Don't Wanna Be a Homosexual" was the inspiration for the tongue-in-cheek song "I Wanna Be a Homosexual" by Screeching Weasel.
