= Severe Exposure =

Studio album by Six Finger Satellite
- Released: July 11, 1995
- Recorded: The Parlour, Pawtucket, Rhode Island
- Genre: Post-hardcore, noise rock
- Length: 34:31
- Label: Sub Pop
- Producer: Six Finger Satellite

Six Finger Satellite chronology
Machine Cuisine (1994)	Severe Exposure (1995)	Clone Theory (1996)

Professional ratings
Review scores
Source	Rating
AllMusic	4/5 stars
Chicago Tribune	3/4 stars

Severe Exposure is the second album by American band Six Finger Satellite, released in 1995 through Sub Pop. It was marked by the extensive use of synthesizers, which augmented the jittery, post-punk sound of the band's earlier releases.

A video was released for the single, "Parlour Games".

== Production ==
Severe Exposure was recorded in Six Finger Satellite's studio, The Parlour, in Pawtucket, Rhode Island.

== Critical reception ==
Trouser Press wrote that "'Rabies (Baby’s Got The)' and 'Simian Fever' are animal aggressive and messy, while sharing the synthetic digitone lusts of new wave." The Chicago Tribune wrote that the album "eases up on the electronics but still assembles an arsenal of vintage synthesizers with Nintendo-like sterility." The Washington Post wrote that the band "continues its explorations of the dark post-punk territory blazed by such British outfits as Gang of Four and the Pop Group." SF Weekly wrote: "Call it a party record, the kind you slip on at that inevitable point when you want 'certain people' to head home." CMJ New Music Monthly thought that "the secret is drummer Rick Pelletier, who plays like a death-machine out of control."

== Track listing ==
All tracks are written by Six Finger Satellite.

No.	Title	Length
1.	"Bad Comrade"	4:28
2.	"Parlour Games"	3:05
3.	"White Queen to Black Knight"	1:57
4.	"Pulling a Train"	3:03
5.	"Simian Fever"	3:55
6.	"Cock Fight"	4:33
7.	"Dark Companion"	1:40
8.	"Where Humans Go"	3:05
9.	"Rabies (Baby's Got The)"	3:26
10.	"Board the Bus"	5:19

== Personnel ==
Six Finger Satellite

- James Apt – bass guitar, clarinet
- John MacLean – guitar, synthesizer
- Richard Ivan Pelletier – drums
- Jeremiah Ryan – vocals, Moog synthesizer

Additional musicians and production

- Jeff Kleinsmith – design
- Charles Peterson – photography
- Six Finger Satellite – production
