= Suffer This: A Compilation of Boston's Backwash =

Compilation album by various artists
- Released: 1988
- Recorded: 1986–1988
- Genre: punk rock
- Label: Gawdawful

Suffer This: A Compilation of Boston's Backwash was a collaboration of five Boston punk\post punk\noise rock bands in the late 1980s. The five bands include The Five, Hullabaloo, Slaughter Shack, Hectic Heyday and Feeding Frenzy.

The sixth band listed—Jerkwater—was convened for this record, and was a super-group of sorts featuring members of Hullabaloo, Feeding Frenzy, Bim Skala Bim and the Zinnias. This is the only known recording featuring both Gonson sisters (JJ and Claudia).

There is also a hidden track on the album: "Highway to Hell" performed by Mimi and the Screeching Chinchillas, an earlier band that included members of Hullabaloo.

The Five originated in Pittsburgh and moved to Boston in 1984. It included Reid Paley, lately known for the Reid Paley Trio and his collaborations with Black Francis; Tom Moran late of the Deliberate Strangers; and Brian Gillespie who went on to perform with My Life with the Thrill Kill Kult (as Skip Towne) and the Concussion Ensemble.

Hullabaloo was from Cambridge, and had future albums on Toxic Shock Records and C/Z Records. Guitarist Sluggo, the compiler of this compilation, went on to found the bands Ain't and the Grannies in San Francisco.

Slaughter Shack is most notable for winning Boston's Rock 'n' Roll Rumble in 1990. Guitarist Dana Ong went on to play with Jay Adams in T.Y.T.L.

Heyday went under a number of monikers, adding a different adjective to their name at each performance—"Hectic" in this case. Over the years they performed with many influential bands, such as the Lemonheads, Buffalo Tom and The Jesus Lizard, in addition to those on this record. Drummer Chris Pee (Chris Sanborn) now performs in The Grannies with Sluggo from Hullabaloo.

Feeding Frenzy was short-lived but influential in the Boston scene. Guitarist Sam McAfee went on to found the band Chloe and drummer Wright Maney is known as being a member of the band Decadence featured on the seminal punk rock album This is Boston, Not L.A.. The lead singer of Feeding Frenzy was JJ Gonson. She went on to manage bands, and has since gained fame as a punk and independent music photographer, with notable photos of Nirvana and Elliott Smith and numerous photo credits on albums by bands such as Hullabaloo and Heatmiser.

== Critical reception ==
"For hardier tastes, or if your toilet has been backed up all month, crank up Suffer This...Jerkwater's cover of 'The Rose'...could be the soundtrack to Sid Vicious' eulogy" – Boston Phoenix

"Suffer This employs six bands for the purpose of exposing the teeming, festering underworld of the Boston music scene, and rubbing all its glorious excess in your face." – CMJ New Music Report

== Tracks ==
All tracks are written by the Artist, except where noted.

Side Burn
No.	Title	Writer(s)	Artist	Length
1.	"The Lickyerbutt Song"		Hullabaloo	1:56
2.	"Take Me to Tomorrow"		The Five	2:44
3.	"Tug"		Feeding Frenzy	4:14
4.	"Damaged Shelter"		Slaughter Shack	3:43
5.	"Tabletop Daydream"		Hectic Heyday	3:02
6.	"The Rose"	Amanda McBroom	Jerkwater	5:01

Side Swipe
No.	Title	Writer(s)	Artist	Length
7.	"Dreaming Ape"		Slaughter Shack	3:51
8.	"Get Off"		Hectic Heyday	1:25
9.	"Taskmaster"		Hullabaloo	4:01
10.	"Blitz Blue"		Feeding Frenzy	3:37
11.	"Breakin' the Law"	Rob Halford, K. K. Downing, Glenn Tipton	Hullabaloo	2:20
12.	"Open Casket"	Paley/Moran	The Five	4:20
13.	"Highway to Hell" (hidden, uncredited track)	Bon Scott, Angus Young, Malcolm Young	Mimi and the Screeching Chinchillas	3:53

== Personnel ==
The Five

- Reid Paley - V.
- Tom Moran - G.
- David Doremus - B.
- Brian Gillespie - D.
- John Maxon - Live Sound

Technical personnel

- Lou Giordano - Engineer and producer
- Butch Belair - Photography

Hullabaloo

- Textured Vegetable Protein Man
- Dangling Love-Death Man
- Captain America Head
- Larvae Man

Technical personnel

- Jeff Landrock - Engineer
- Harry Brown II - Engineer
- J.J. Gonson - Photography

Jerkwater

- JJ - Love & Laughter
- Claudia Gonson - Backing V.
- TQ - Piano
- slüggbutt - G.
- Tricka Lye - B.
- Jim Arhelger - D. & metal chair

Technical personnel

- Jeff Landrock - Engineer
- Harry Brown II - Engineer

Slaughter Shack

- Colin Burns - V. & G.
- Ellen Mieczkowski - D.
- George O'Malley - Horn & Backing V.
- Dana Ong - G.
- Deb Scott - B.

Technical personnel

- Paul Kolderie - Engineer
- Tracy White - Photography

Hectic Heyday

- BahB Finetime - Rainbow Fork, Verbal Sentiment
- Chris Pee - Anger & Anxiety
- Mann Well - Tension & Comedy

Technical personnel

Sean Slade - Engineer

Feeding Frenzy

- JJ - V.
- Sam - G.
- TrickaLye - B.
- Wright - D.

Technical personnel

- Sluggo - Photography
