= Weapon (EP) =

EP by Six Finger Satellite
- Released: 1991
- Genre: Noise rock
- Length: 20:51
- Label: Sub Pop
- Producer: Tim O'Heir, Six Finger Satellite

Six Finger Satellite chronology
| Weapon (1991) | The Pigeon Is the Most Popular Bird (1993) |

Professional ratings
Review scores
| Source | Rating |
|---|---|
| Allmusic | 2/5 stars |

Weapon is an EP by Six Finger Satellite, released in 1991 through Sub Pop.

== Track listing ==
All tracks are written by Six Finger Satellite.

| No. | Title | Length |
|---|---|---|
| 1. | "Weapon" | 3:29 |
| 2. | "Niponese National Anthem" | 4:59 |
| 3. | "Shimkus Yell" | 4:53 |
| 4. | "Polish the Shine (Satchmo)" | 7:41 |

== Personnel ==
Six Finger Satellite

- Chris Dixon – bass guitar
- John MacLean – guitar
- Richard D. Pelletier – drums
- Peter Phillips – guitar, additional vocals
- Jeremiah Ryan – vocals

Additional musicians and production

- Tim O'Heir – production
- Six Finger Satellite – production
