= Hard to Believe: A Kiss Covers Compilation =

- Version 1

Compilation album by various artists
- Released: 1990
- Recorded: Between 1989–1990
- Genres: Grunge, punk rock, alternative rock, hardcore punk
- Length: 75:15
- Label: C/Z Records

Alternative cover
- Version 2

Professional ratings
Review scores
Source	Rating
AllMusic	3/5 stars
Select	3/5 medals

Hard to Believe: A Kiss Covers Compilation is a Kiss tribute album with all of the tracks performed by (at the time) underground, independent, punk bands of the late 1980s. The two bands featured on this album that would continue on to greater success are Nirvana and Melvins, though Doug Martsch of Treepeople later founded Built to Spill. Smelly Tongues bassist Bill Gibson would later join the Lemonheads and drummer Jess Ciampa later joined The Tango Saloon. This is one of two released Nirvana recordings with Jason Everman on guitar.

== Tracks ==
No.	Title	Writer(s)	Artist	Length
1.	"Detroit Rock City"	Paul Stanley, Bob Ezrin	Bullet LaVolta	4:32
2.	"Parasite"	Ace Frehley	Smelly Tongues	5:06
3.	"Snow Blind"	Frehley	Skin Yard	4:58
4.	"Deuce"	Gene Simmons	Treepeople	4:29
5.	"Christine Sixteen"	Simmons	All	3:47
6.	"Calling Dr. Love"	Simmons	Hullabaloo	5:22
7.	"God of Thunder"	Stanley	Melvins	5:17
8.	"Beth"	Peter Criss, Ezrin, Stan Penridge	Coffin Break	4:38
9.	"Rip It Out"	Frehley, Larry Kelly, Sue Kelly	Chemical People	5:04
10.	"I Want You"	Stanley	King Snake Roost	5:39
11.	"Do You Love Me?"	Stanley, Ezrin, Kim Fowley	Nirvana	5:16
12.	"Lick It Up"	Stanley, Vinnie Vincent	Hard-Ons	4:51
13.	"War Machine"	Simmons, Bryan Adams, Jim Vallance	Instigators	5:27
14.	"Makin' Love"	Stanley, Sean Delaney	Thrust	5:48
15.	"Love Gun"	Stanley	Surfin' Caesars	4:56
Total length:				75:15

Songs that appear on other versions of the album include:

- "Is That You?" (Gerard McMahon) performed by Girl Monstar
- "Sure Know Something" (Stanley, Vini Poncia) performed by The Whipper Snappers
- "Charisma" (Simmons, Marks) performed by The Plunderers

== Various labels ==
- Waterfront Records DAMP-121 (Australia, 8/90 – Double LP, Red Vinyl)
- Southern Records DAMP-121 (UK, 8/90 – Single LP in Gatefold)
- Records (Europe, 8/90 – Single LP)
- C/Z Records CZ-024 (USA, 8/90 – Single LP in Gatefold)
