= House of Large Sizes =

American rock band

- House of Large Sizes, 1994

Background information
- Origin: Cedar Falls, Iowa, U.S.
- Genres: alternative rock
- Years active: 1986–2003
- Labels: What Are Records?; Red Decibel
- Past members: Dave Deibler; Barb Schilf; Mark Munn; Dave Berg; Brent Hanson

House of Large Sizes (sometimes known as HOLS) was an American alternative rock band from Cedar Falls, Iowa, formed in 1986. The band was led by singer/guitarist Dave Deibler and singer/bassist Barb Schilf, with three different drummers during their career.

== History ==
House of Large Sizes was formed in 1986 by Deibler, Schilf, and original drummer Dave Berg. Deibler and Schilf were then a couple and have since gotten married. Mark Munn and Brent Hanson played drums for the group in later years. Their sound has been described as mixing the pop-oriented alternative rock of the Pixies with hardcore punk, with some elements of rap and heavy metal.

They released their first album, One Big Cake in 1989; the following year, they signed with What Are Records? and released Heat Miser. They were briefly signed to the Red Decibel subsidiary of Columbia Records, which released My Ass-Kicking Life in 1994; the band then returned to their previous label.

The band's 2000 album Idiots Out Wandering Around references the initials of their home state of Iowa. Their final album House of Large Sizes was released in 2002, and they disbanded the following year. They reunited for short tours of Iowa and Minnesota in 2007, 2009, and 2013. Deibler and Schilf now operate a bar and clothing boutique in Cedar Falls.

House of Large Sizes are 2023 inductees into the Iowa Rock and Roll Hall of Fame.

== Discography ==
- One Big Cake (1989)
- Heat Miser (1990)
- House of Large Sizes (EP) (1992)
- My Ass-Kicking Life (1993)
- Little HOLS on the Prairie (1997)
- Glass Cockpit (1997)
- Not for Sale (1998)
- Idiots Out Wandering Around (2000)
- House of Large Sizes (2002)
