= The Palladium Book of European Castles =

The Palladium Book of European Castles is a 1985 role-playing supplement published by Palladium Books.

== Contents ==
The Palladium Book of European Castles is a supplement in which historic European castle plans are provided with illustrations.

== Publication history ==
The Palladium Book of European Castles was written by Matthew Balent, with art by Michael Gustovich, and was published by Palladium Books in 1985 as a 48-page book.

== Reception ==
Ken Rolston reviewed Castle Book II and The Palladium Book of European Castles in White Wolf #40 (1994) and stated that "I only use European Castles for real quick-and-dirty improvisation. On the other hand, Castle Book II curiously remains fresh and useful for me despite its outdated design."
