= Sloppy Seconds (band) =

American punk band

- Origin: Indianapolis, Indiana
- Genres: Punk rock, garage punk, hard rock, Junk rock
- Years active: 1985–present
- Labels: Kid Tested; Nitro; Taang!; Coldfront; Alternative Testicles; Last Resort; Toxic Shock; Metal Blade
- Members: B.A. Ace Hardwhere; Bo'Ba Jam; Steve Sloppy
- Past members: Danny Roadkill
- Website: myspace.com/kingsofjunkrock

Sloppy Seconds is an American, Ramones-influenced punk band sometimes referred to as a junk rock band from Indianapolis, Indiana, that started in 1984. They gained notoriety in the underground punk scene with gritty and controversial songs like "Come Back, Traci," "I Don't Want to be a Homosexual", "Janie is a Nazi", "I Want 'em Dead" and "So Fucked Up."

The band's unusual and controversial lyrics encompass pornography, classic horror movies, classic television shows, comic books, alcohol, being fat, and getting drunk.

== Band history ==
=== Establishment ===
Sloppy Seconds was formed in 1984 by a group of friends from Indianapolis, Indiana. The band spent its first three years writing songs and honing its craft, releasing its first record, a four-song EP called The First Seven Inches, in 1987.

Following the release of the first EP, the band went into the studio on its own, assisted by producer Paul Mahern, without a record label deal. Knowing from an early date that they were not a prolific recording band, the band sought to make an impact with its first full-length release, tabbing the record Destroyed as a play on Destroyer, a 1976 platinum album by stadium rockers Kiss. In search of a home, the band sent out a demo tape including rough mixes of the first four songs completed for the project, with Toxic Shock Records ultimately picking up the project. This debut album was finally released in 1989, featuring parody artwork by Mike Kreffel, a fan of the band.

A series of three singles followed for fans of the 7-inch vinyl format, featuring popular album tracks such as the anthemic "I Don't Wanna Be a Homosexual" and their paean to underaged porn queen Traci Lords, "Come Back Traci."

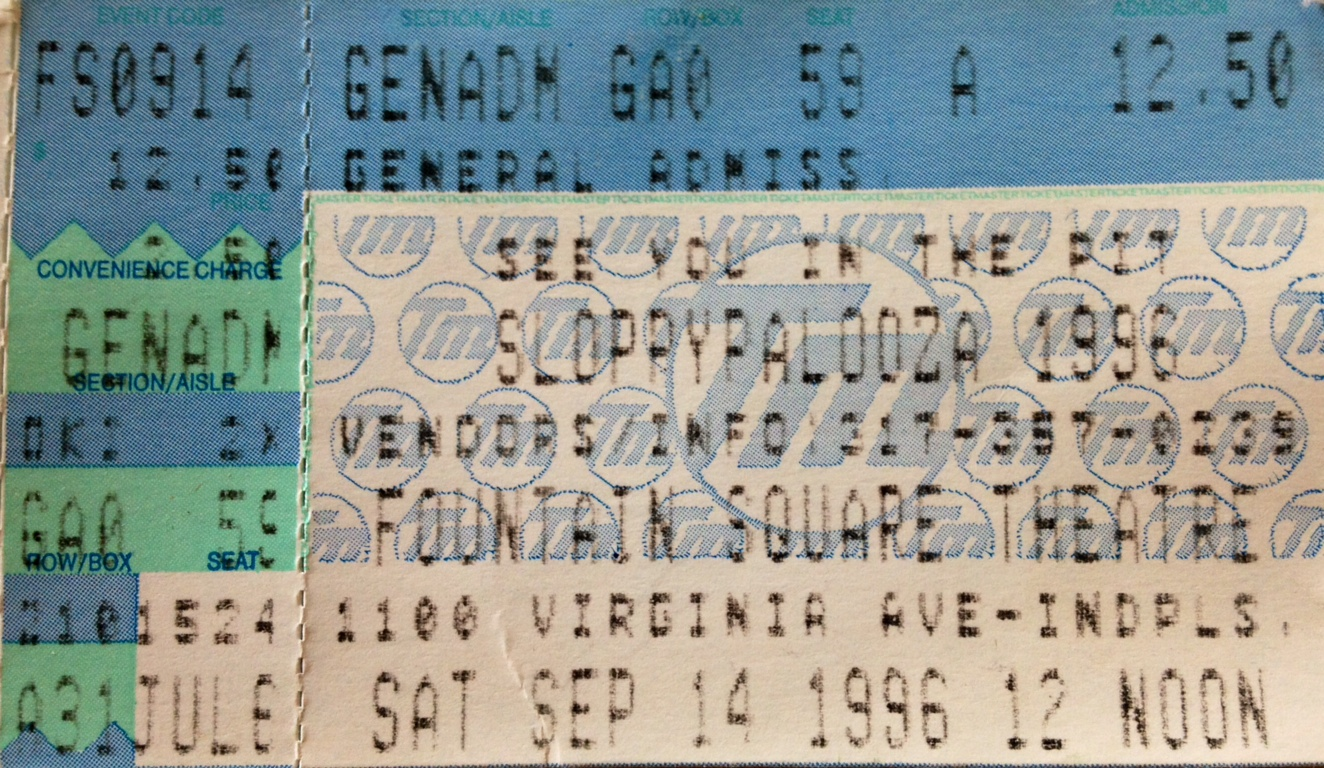
Sloppy Seconds hosted a yearly festival called Sloppypalooza in Indianapolis, Indiana.

=== Band name ===
They came up with the name when B.A. threw a house party while his parents were out of town. After around 30 minutes of doing mediocre covers of 50's songs, they changed the name from "Mock Trash" to Sloppy Seconds, a reference to their bad covers and thanks to the movie Porky's.

=== Reunion ===
In January 2008, the band announced they had signed to Kid Tested Records, owned by Dave Parasite of the Parasites. That year, they released Endless Bummer, their first full-length in ten years. In June and July 2008, the band promoted the album with a tour of the United States, which included an appearance at Insubordination Fest.

Sloppy Seconds' first studio album, Destroyed, was reissued on Kid Tested records in 2010. They went on a short East Coast tour in May and June 2010.

=== Personnel ===
- B.A. – vocals
- Ace "Spice" Hardwhere – guitars
- Bo'Ba Jam – bass
- Steve – drums

Former members include guitarist and founding member Danny "Roadkill" Thompson, alias "Dr. Roadkill", who left the band in 1993.

== Discography ==
=== Albums ===
- Destroyed (Toxic Shock) (1989)
- Knock Yer Block Off (Taang!) (1993)
- Live: No Time for Tuning (self-released) (1996)
- More Trouble Than They're Worth (Nitro) (1998)
- Endless Bummer (Kid Tested) (2008)

=== Singles and EPs ===
- The First Seven Inches 7-inch EP (Alternative Testicles) (1987)
- Germany EP (1988) (Hebre Scherbe) (1988)
- "Come Back, Traci" / "Leaving On A Jet Plane" (Toxic Shock) (1989)
- "Where Eagles Dare" / "Ice Cream Man" (Roadkill) (1990)
- "I Don't Wanna Be A Homosexual" b/w "Human Waste" (Toxic Shock) (1990)
- Lonely Christmas EP (Taang!) (1992)
- 12/29/94 (Fireside Bowl – Chicago, IL) EP (V.M.L.) (1994)
- Split 7-inch with The Vindictives (V.M.L.) (1997) – "Why Don't Lesbians Love Me?" / "Pervert At Large"
- Garbage Days Regurgitated EP (Nitro) (2000)
- "You Can't Kill Joey Ramone" / "Can't Stand Rock'n'Roll" (Wallride) (2010)
- Split 7-inch with Dangerbird (Failure) (2017) – "Johhny Be Dead"
- Split Hits The Fans Split 7-inch with Antiseen (Failure) (2002) – Thanks For The Mammaries"

=== Compilations ===
- The First Seven Inches...And Then Some! (Taang!) (1992)
- NecroComicon 2005 (self-released) (2004)
- Play With Yer Records! Mistakes and Pisstakes Vol. 1 (Failure Records and Tapes) (2024)

=== Compilation appearances ===
- War Between The States: North cassette (Wally And The Beaver) (1985) – "Before Cable"
- There's A Method To Our Madness (Phantom) (1986) – "Jerry's Kids)
- District of Colombia cassette (Fucksafe) (1988) – "So Fucked Up", "If I Had A Woman", "Germany", "I Don't Want To Take You Home"
- France Kontakt Usa cassette (Broken Tape) (1988) – "I Don't Want To Take You Home", "So Fucked Up"
- War Between The States: North cassette (TPOS) (1989) – "I Don't Want To Take You Home", "So Fucked Up"
- Caroline Records-Rock Sampler 6 (Adventures In Music) (1992) – "If I Had A Woman"
- Welcome to Our Nightmare: A Tribute to Alice Cooper (Triple X) (1993) – "Serious"
- Decade Of Disaster (Westworld Records) (1994) – "Veronica"
- Punk Chartbusters Vol 2 (Wolverine Records/Soundcarrier (1995) – "The Candy Man"
- Ox-Compilation #23 – Eye-sore (Ox Fanzine) (1996) – "Come Back, Traci"
- 15 Bullets-The Wolverine Compilation (Wolverine) (1996) – "Ice Cream Man"
- KPNK: Punk Radio – All The Hits All The Time (Countdown Records) (1997) - "The Candyman"
- Deep Thoughts (Nitro) (1998) – "The Thing From Uranus", "Let's Kill Trendy"
- V.M. Live presents... (V.M.L. Records/Liberation Records) (1999) – "Steal Your Beer", "Your Sister", "Come Back, Traci", "The Queen From Outer Space", "Conned Again"
- Son Of Slam Chops (Triple X) (1999) – "I Don't Wanna Be A Homosexual"
- The World According To Stone Entertainment (Volcom/Stone) (1999) – "Smashed Again"
- Social Chaos Anarchy In North America Tour '99 (Beloved Recordings)
- U.S. Indies Covered Punx Collection (Two Children Records) (2000) – "The Candyman"
- A Punk Tribute To Metallica (Cleopatria Records) (2001) – "Hit The Lights"
- That Darn Punk (Original Motion Picture Soundtrack) (Kung Fu) (2001) – "Queen Of Outer Space"
- Punk It! Vol. 4 (Imperial) (2003) – "V.A.C.A.T.I.O.N. (In The Summer"
- Punk Chartbusters Vol. 1 + 2 2XCD (Wolverine) (2003) – "Candyman (Sammy Davis Junior)"
- Punk It! Vol. 5 (Imperial) (2004) – "Hit The Lights"
- Rockzilla JPN Nitro Records Compilation Vol. 1 (Nitro) (2004) – "Ephedrine Machine"
- Punk It! Best! (Imperial) (2004) "V.A.C.A.T.I.O.N. (In The Summertime)", "I Won't Grow Up"
- The Blackest Box 2XCE (Cleopatria) (2007) – "Hit The Lights"
- Rock'n'Roll In My Soul 2XCD (Wolverine) (2008) -"Mighty Heros"
- The Ultimate Metallica Tribute 2XCD (Red Line Records) (2008) – "Hit The Lights"
- Sick Girl Soundtrack – "So Fucked Up", "I Want 'em Dead"
- Insubordination Fest Baltimore MD '08 live CD & DVD (Insubordination Records) (2009) – "Let's Kill The Trendy"
- Punk Rock Xmas (Rhino) – "Hooray For Santa Claus (Theme From 'Santa Claus Conquers The Martians')"
- The World's Greatest Metallica Tribute (Tributized) – "Hit The Lights"
- Temporary Loss Of Self (Control) (Crash Course Tapes) – "So Fucked Up"

=== Music videos ===
- "Veronica" (1989)
- "Fifteen Minutes... Or It's Free" (1998)
- (((PBS))) Punk Broadcasting System Volume 1 DVD (Cold Front) (2001) – "Fifteen Minutes Or It's Free"
