= The Palladium Book of Weapons & Castles =

1982 role-playing game supplement

The Palladium Book of Weapons & Castles is a role-playing game supplement published by Palladium Books in 1982.

== Contents ==
The Palladium Book of Weapons & Castles is a supplement which details ranged and siege weapons from the medieval and ancient periods, with descriptions of 14 real-world European castles detailed using historical sources.

== Publication history ==
The Palladium Book of Weapons & Castles was compiled by Matthew Balent, and was published by Palladium Books in 1982 as a 48-page saddle-stitched book, with another printing that same year as a square-bound book.

The information from this book was later revised and included in The Compendium of Weapons, Armour & Castles.

The book was republished in 2002.

== Reception ==
Christopher R. Celtruda reviewed The Palladium Book of Weapons and Castles for Fantasy Gamer magazine and stated that "In conclusion, Weapons and Castles is an invaluable role-players aid, It is well worth the price for any serious medieval-oriented referee and is a great asset for dealing with castle combat."

== Reviews ==
- Asimov's Science Fiction v10n11 (1986 11)
