= The Palladium Book of Weapons and Castles of the Orient =

Role-playing game supplement

Weapons and Castles of the Orient
- Designers: Matthew Balent
- Illustrators: Michael Kucharski; Ed Kwiatkowski; Kevin Siembieda
- Publishers: Palladium Books
- Publication: 1984
- Genres: Oriental medieval

The Palladium Book of Weapons and Castles of the Orient is a supplement published by Palladium Books in 1984 as a sourcebook about arms and fortifications from East Asia for use in fantasy role-playing games.

== Description ==
The Palladium Book of Weapons and Castles of the Orient is a system agnostic book — it does not conform to any particular role-playing game system — that details weapons such as staves, polearms, swords, chain weapons, types of armor, castles, and other fortifications used in East Asia, dating back from ancient history up to modern times. This information can be used by a game master while planning a fantasy role-playing game campaign in an Oriental setting.

The book is divided into three parts:

1. Bladed weapons from Japan, China, and Malaysia, with illustrations of each.
2. Armor, including face masks, helmets and the steps in donning armor. Most examples are Japanese samurai armor, but there are a few a few Chinese and Malaysian examples.
3. Castles, including illustrations, cross-sections and plans of Japanese and Chinese fortifications.

== Publication history ==
In 1981, Palladium published Matthew Balent's The Palladium Book of Weapons & Armor,a book that outlined medieval military gear that could be used by a dungeon master. Balent provided three more books for Palladium, including The Palladium Book of Weapons and Castles of the Orient, published in 1984 as a 48-page softcover book with illustrations by Michael Kucharski, Ed Kwiatkowski, and Kevin Siembieda.

== Reception ==
In Issue 30 of Abyss (Summer 1984), Carl Jones noted "Some of the castle diagrams are particularly good, while some of the weapon drawings are a bit childish." Jones found the included combat mechanics calling them "somehow both complex and overly general." Jones also found the armor section "a bit overcomplicated" but found the castle section "just what you need, clear comprehensible drawings of lots of castles and features, though I do wish there had been more." Jones concluded, "This will be of use to those just getting into an oriental setting ... the appeal is limited, but it might be worth looking into." Two years later, in Issue 37 of Abyss, Jon Schuller noted that this book had the same pros and cons as other books in this series. On the plus side, Schuller thought "that it provides a great deal of information of weapons and armor of the medieval east." But Schuller found the weapon sketches "rather clumsy" and also noted "What they have here is great, but I'd really like to see more text and information about fighting techniques and the nature of castles and battles in the Orient." Despite this, Schuller concluded, "I can definitely recommend Weapons and Castles of the Orient as a useful background campaign for role-playing and war gaming, especially if your playing style makes personal combat and equipment an important part of your campaign."

In Issue 71 of Space Gamer, William Barton commented that "For players of Oriental games such as Bushido or Land of the Rising Sun who want a great deal of detail, this book should prove most valuable. For others with only a passing interest, it probably isn't worth the investment."
