= Toxic Shock Records =

- Founded: 1983
- Founder: Bill Sassenberger, Julianna Towns
- Defunct: 1998
- Genre: Punk rock, hardcore, post-hardcore
- Country of origin: United States
- Location: Pomona, California; Tucson, Arizona
- Official website: toxicranchrecords.com

Toxic Shock Records was an American independent record label based first in Pomona, California, then in Tucson, Arizona. The label was spawned from the record store of the same name, by its founders Bill Sassenberger and Julianna Towns in 1983, when they released the first of the Noise from Nowhere series of 7-inch EP compilations. For the next decade they released singles, compilations and albums by many notable and influential bands of the hardcore, noise rock and post-hardcore scenes.

== History ==
Bill Sassenberger opened his first Toxic Shock record store in Pomona, CA in 1980. He specialized in underground punk records from independent labels. He expanded to mail-order soon after by advertising in music magazines. In 1983, he and wife Julianna Towns released Noise from Nowhere, a 7-inch, 33 rpm EP featuring four local underground punk bands: Kent State, Modern Industry, Manson Youth and their own band Moslem Birth (whose name was a parody of Christian Death). Noise from Nowhere featured cover art by Pushead. With this release, Toxic Shock Records was born.

Singles from Modern Industry, Peace Corpse (the renamed Moslem Birth), and Seattle's Skin Yard followed, as well as albums by Italian punkers Raw Power, Corrosion of Conformity, and the Dayglo Abortions. In 1988 Bill and Julianna moved the label and the store to Tucson, Arizona. From Tucson, they released albums by Hickoids, Th' Inbred, Hullabaloo, House of Large Sizes, Sloppy Seconds and Treepeople.

They also re-established the Noise from Nowhere 7-inch EP as a series. Noise from Nowhere Vol. 2, released in 1989, featured cover songs performed by label bands Hullabaloo ("Highway Star"), Hickoids (theme from "Green Acres"), House of Large Sizes ("Half-Breed") and Sloppy Seconds ("Candy Man"). Eight more Noise from Nowhere volumes would follow, featuring label bands as well as one-off recordings by other up-and-coming bands, including a rare single by Green Magnet School. Noise from Nowhere Vol. 10 was the last record released under the Toxic Shock imprint featuring, appropriately, four underground Tucson bands.

They released a few more CDs under a new name—Westworld—including the Decade of Disaster compilation chronicling the Toxic Shock years, but soon reverted to a record store specializing in obscure, underground music, now renamed Toxic Ranch Records.

== Noise from Nowhere series ==
| Volume | Year | Bands |
|---|---|---|
| 1 | 1983 | Kent State, Modern Industry, Manson Youth, Moslem Birth |
| 2 | 1989 | Hullabaloo, Hickoids, House of Large Sizes, Sloppy Seconds |
| 3 | 1989 | Cattle, What Went Wrong |
| 4 | 1989 | G-Whiz, Lonely Trojans |
| 5 | 1990 | Green Magnet School, God's Acre |
| 6 | 1991 | House of Large Sizes, Treepeople |
| 7 | 1991 | Bhang Revival, Hullabaloo |
| 8 | 1991 | Rancid Hell Spawn, The Fells |
| 9 | 1992 | Mondo Guano, Slo*Deluxe |
| 10 | 1992 | Earl's Family Bombers, Zero Tolerance Task Force, Feast Upon Cactus Thorn, Opinion Zero |

== Roster ==
- Corrosion of Conformity
- Dayglo Abortions
- Decry
- Datura Seeds
- Hickoids
- House of Large Sizes
- Hullabaloo
- Jesus Chrysler
- Th' Inbred
- Mad Parade
- Major Accident
- Massacre Guys
- Modern Industry
- Peace Corpse
- Raw Power
- Red Tide
- Skin Yard
- Sloppy Seconds
- The Stupids
- Treepeople
- Zero Boys
