= Coney Island in popular culture =

Coney Island has been featured in novels, films, television shows, cartoons, and theatrical plays.

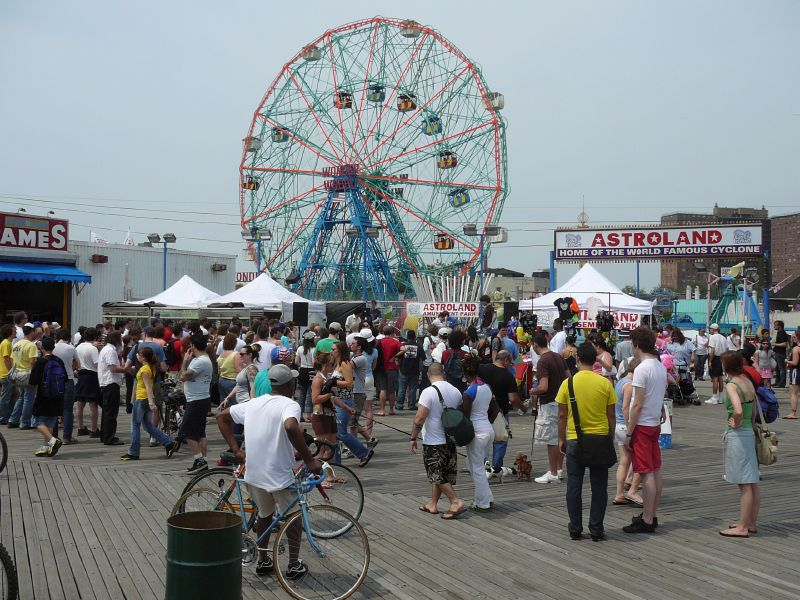
A view of the Wonder Wheel with the former Astroland Park in the foreground.

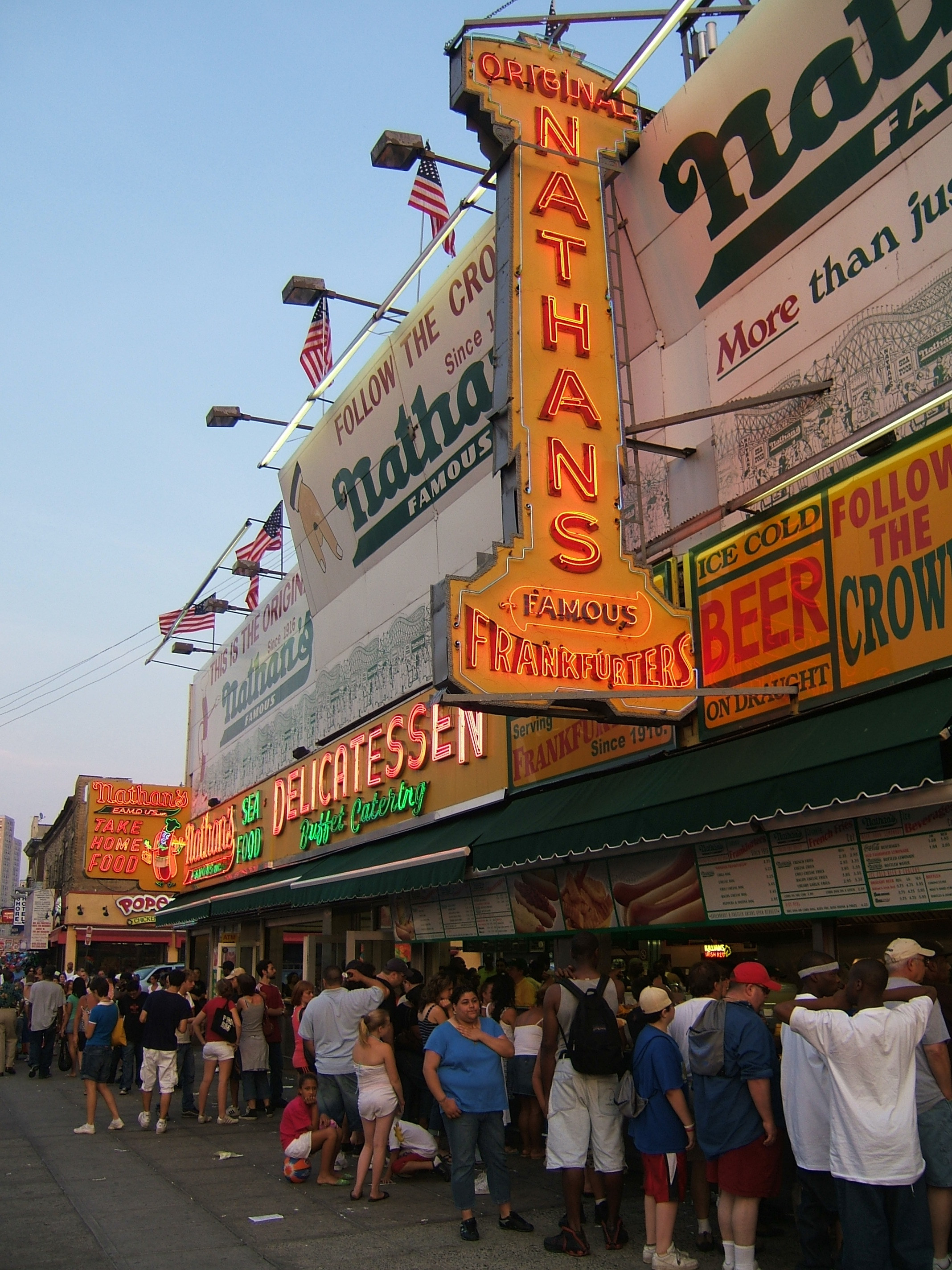
Nathan's Famous

== By medium ==
=== In literature ===
- Coney Island is often mentioned in the stories of O. Henry.
- Coney Island features prominently in Joseph Heller's novel Closing Time and his memoir Now and Then: From Coney Island to Here
- "Coney Island", a poem by Jose Martí (1881)
- A Coney Island of the Mind by Lawrence Ferlinghetti is a classic collection of poems from the Beat Generation. The title was inspired by Henry Miller's work.
- Coney Island Wonder Stories, edited by Robert J. Howe and John Ordover, 2005, contains science fiction and fantasy stories set in Coney Island throughout its history, by Kristine Kathryn Rusch, Steven Popkes, Maureen McHugh, Mike Resnick, J. R. Dunn, Kij Johnson, Paul Levinson, and other writers.
- The Electric Michelangelo, a novel by British novelist Sarah Hall, is set partly in Coney Island and describes much of the amusement area as it was at its peak prior to World War II and describes some of its post-war decline.
- In the comic book G.I. Joe, the character Scarface lived under an abandoned roller coaster on Coney Island.
- In The Great Gatsby, Gatsby invites Nick to go to Coney Island after his meeting with Jordan Baker.
- In It's Like This, Cat, Dave and Cat go to Coney Island in a chapter.
- The Last Shot, by Darcy Frey, follows a group of high school basketball players from Coney Island.
- Hubert Selby Jr's novel, Requiem for a Dream, is set in Coney Island.
- Samantha at Coney Island by "Josiah Allen's Wife" (Marietta Holley), 1911, was a popular young-adult novel in the early 20th century.
- In Twelve by Nick McDonell, a novel about a group of rich kids in Manhattan who pass their time taking drugs and partying, the protagonist, White Mike, visits Coney Island. The amusement area is described very negatively (shabby, run-down, deserted, no kids, but hookers and drug dealers).
- The Warriors by Sol Yurick is the 1965 novel that inspired the 1979 film of the same name. The novel itself is loosely based upon Anabasis by Xenophon.
- Diana Holland spends the day in Coney Island with her lover Henry Schoonmaker in Rumors: A Luxe Novel by Anna Godbersen.
- In "Coney Island Odyssey" by Murray Koren a new memoir published in 2012 discusses growing up Jewish in Coney Island in the 1930s.
- Dreamland, by Kevin Baker, is set in New York during Coney Island's golden years. The plot weaves in and out of Dreamland amusement park.
- Julián is a Mermaid, a 2018 children's book, revolves around the Coney Island Mermaid Parade.

=== In music ===
- The music video for Beyoncé's song "XO" was filmed at Coney Island and includes footage taken on The Cyclone.
- Coney Island Native, Rapper Magneto Dayo released an album titled "Coney Island" paying homage to his hometown
- The cover of Cyndi Lauper's album She's So Unusual was shot at Henderson Walk on Coney Island by Annie Leibovitz in 1983.

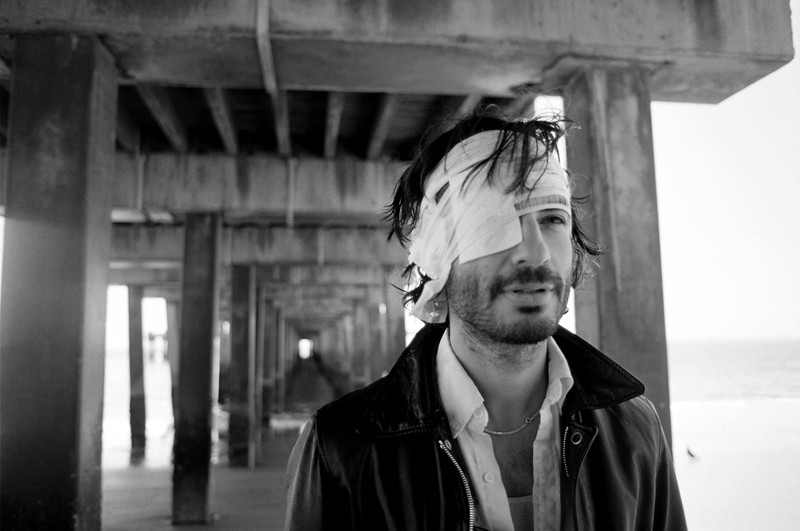
Jason Sebastian Russo at Coney Island filming a Hopewell music video, April 2009

- English singer-songwriter and actor David Bowie refers to Coney Island in the 2001 song Uncle Floyd (Toy album, finally released in 2021) and 2002 song Slip Away (Heathen album) : "Sailing over Coney Island / Twinkle twinkle Uncle Floyd", as a tribute to Floyd Vivino and "The Uncle Floyd Show".
- An early musical reference came in 1926 with "Coney Island Washboard", music by Hampton Durand and Jerry Adams, words by Ned Nestor and Aude Shugart. The song is commonly accompanied by a percussionist playing a washboard.
- "Goodbye, My Coney Island Baby" was written in 1948 by Les Applegate and is often included in the repertoire of a barbershop quartets.
- Australian modern classical composer Don Banks (1923–1980) composed a short orchestral work called "Coney Island" around 1960 to 1961, which gives a vivid musical picture of the amusement park. It was included on an L.P. record, "Musical Merry-go-round", released in 1961, with music by various composers inspired by the circus and fairground world, played by the Sinfonia of London, conducted by Douglas Gamley and Robert Irving.
- In 1962 the American doo-wop group The Excellents released a song "Coney Island Baby" which hit #51 on the Billboard Hot 100 in 1962.
- American singer-songwriter Lou Reed's 1976 album is entitled Coney Island Baby and features the track "Coney Island Baby".
- In 1980 the legendary Japanese idol Momoe Yamaguchi's 20th album "Möbius's Game" has a song entitled "哀愁のコニーアイランド (Coney Island of Sorrow)".
- Australian band Men At Work mention Coney Island on the track "Upstairs In My House" from their 1983 release Cargo (album).
- American rock band Aerosmith has a song called "Bone to Bone (Coney Island Whitefish Boy)" from their 1979 album Night in the Ruts.
- The debut album of the American jazz band The Lounge Lizards contains a song called "I Remember Coney Island".
- American rock band Joan Jett & the Blackhearts has a song called "Coney Island Whitefish" from their 1982 album Album.
- American rock band Velvet Underground has a song called "Coney Island Steeplechase" on the 1986 album Another View.
- British Group Swing Out Sister recorded a track called "Coney Island Man" during their "Kaleidoscope World" sessions and featured on their single "You On My Mind" in 1989.
- Pop group New Kids on the Block filmed parts of the video for "Please Don't Go Girl" at Coney Island. Several rides including the Wonder Wheel and the Hell Hole are shown.
- American rock band Mercury Rev references Coney Island in the song "Coney Island Cyclone", from their 1991 album Yerself Is Steam.
- American hip-hop trio Salt-n-Pepa filmed the video at Coney Island for their single "Shoop" in 1993.
- American synth-pop band The Magnetic Fields references Coney Island in "Strange Powers" from 1994's Holiday.
- American alternative rap / alternative rock group Fun Lovin' Criminals has a song called "Coney Island Girl" on their 1996 album Come Find Yourself.
- The music video for the 1999 tune “Summer Girls” by LFO (Lyte Funkie Ones) was filmed on the Boardwalk when the Astroland Rocket was on Gregory & Paul’s roof and provided the setting for this top 10 summer hit.
- American rock band Death Cab for Cutie have a song called "Coney Island" from their 2001 album, The Photo Album.
- American singer-songwriter Tom Waits has a song called "Coney Island Baby," on his 2002 album Blood Money. He also references Coney Island in his songs "Table Top Joe" from the 2002 album Alice and "Take It With Me" from the 1999 album Mule Variations.
- New York singer/songwriter and banjo contortionist, Curtis Eller has a song "Coney Island Blue" on his 2004 album Taking Up Serpents Again
- German punk band The Flunkeys released a single from their 2007 album, No Riot, called "Coney Island".
- American rapper Bizarre's 2007 album release is titled Blue Cheese 'n' Coney Island referring to the style of chili dog.
- American band Beat Circus' 2008 album entitled Dreamland, references the turn-of-the-century Coney Island theme park Dreamland in several of its songs including Coney Island Creepshow and Hell Gate, and includes historical images and postcards of early Coney Island donated by the Coney Island Museum.
- The indie/folk-rock band Good Old War have a song called "Coney Island" on their debut album, Only Way To Be Alone.
- In 1995, the music video of "One of Us" by Joan Osborne featured Coney Island.
- In 1982, the music video of "Even the Nights Are Better" by Air Supply featured Coney Island.
- Brooklyn-based hardcore/post-grunge band Life of Agony filmed a music video for their single "Through and Through" on Coney Island beach in 1993.
- The song "Topsy's Revenge" by the band Grand Archives tells the story of the death of Topsy, the Coney Island elephant, electrocuted by the owners of Luna Park and filmed by the Edison Manufacturing Company.
- The song "Coney Island" by Plastiscines French Rock band on their album About Love
- British band The Coral have a song called "Coney Island" on their 2010 album Butterfly House.
- Scottish band Franz Ferdinand references Coney Island and the Coney Island Cyclone in their single "Eleanor Put Your Boots On" ("But if you run / you can run to the Coney Island rollercoaster").
- The track "Sleep" on Canadian post-rock band Godspeed You! Black Emperor's 2000 album Lift Your Skinny Fists Like Antennas to Heaven begins with a sample of an old man reminiscing nostalgically about Coney Island.
- British boy band The Wanted filmed the music video for their 2010 single "Lose My Mind" at Deno's Wonder Wheel Amusement Park. Several rides, including the bumper cars and the Wonder Wheel, are shown.
- South Korean boy group BIGBANG filmed the music video for their 2012 single "Blue" and the Cyclone is shown.
- South Korean singers Son Ga-In and Jo Hyung-woo filmed the music video for their 2013 single "Brunch" and Deno's Wonder Wheel Amusement Park and Riegelmann Boardwalk are shown.
- The Klezmatics recorded an album of Woody Guthrie lyrics about Coney Island that they put to music called "Wonder Wheel." It includes the song "Mermaid Avenue."
- Lana Del Rey frequently references Coney Island in her songs and often refers to herself as the Queen of Coney Island. Examples include the songs "Carmen," "Off To The Races," "Mermaid Motel" and "TV In Black & White."
- Taylor Swift has a song called "Coney Island" featuring the National on her 2020 album Evermore.
- Alex Weiser wrote a song cycle called "Coney Island Days" based on an oral history interview with his grandmother about her childhood including playing in Coney Island and working at her family's Coney Island knish store.
- Country singer Alan Jackson filmed the music video for his 2012 single "So You Don't Have to Love Me Anymore" in Coney Island.

=== In film ===
- In the silent short Coney Island (1917), starring Fatty Arbuckle and Buster Keaton, the scene is Luna Park amusement park and several famous rides are featured, including Witching Waves.
- In A.I. (2001), directed by Steven Spielberg and featuring Haley Joel Osment, David and Teddy take a submersible to the Blue Fairy, which turns out to be a statue from a submerged attraction at Coney Island. Teddy and David become trapped when the park's Ferris wheel falls on their vehicle.
- In the film Angel Heart, Harry Angel (Mickey Rourke) goes to Coney Island, to gather information on his case. The Wonder Wheel is seen in the background.
- Alvy Singer, the lead character in Woody Allen's 1977 semi-autobiographical film Annie Hall, lived in Coney Island as a child in a house that was under the Thunderbolt rollercoaster that shook wildly every time the coaster made its rounds. Alvy's father ran the bumper cars' concession.
- A Coney Island amusement park is the setting of the Rhedosaurus' last stand in the 1953 science-fiction film The Beast from 20,000 Fathoms.
- The final scene of the 2008 film Cloverfield shows the main characters on the Ferris wheel at Coney Island.
- It was the title and the setting for the 1943 Betty Grable musical, Coney Island.
- The 1998 drama He Got Game takes place in Coney Island.
- The 1985 film Heaven Help Us contains a scene where Andrew McCarthy and Mary Stuart Masterson's characters spend a date at Coney Island, and kiss passionately (and possibly go even further than that) under a boardwalk during a rainstorm.
- The 1927 silent film It, starring Clara Bow, features a trip to the park and a tour of the historic rides.
- Coney Island is portrayed in the 2015 adult animated short film Last Days of Coney Island, written and directed by Ralph Bakshi.
- The 1974 Gordon Parks film The Super Cops contains a scene where David Greenberg (Ron Leibman) and Robert Hantz (David Selby) go undercover on an independent drug bust in Coney Island.
- In the 1979 film The Warriors, a gang of the same name fight their way back to Coney Island after being accused of a murder that they did not commit.
- In the 1953 film Little Fugitive, a small boy runs away to Coney Island after thinking he has killed his brother.
- In Madigan, Coney Island is the backdrop for a scene wherein the title character and his partner speak with a local bookie to get information on their suspect.
- Coney Island is a location in Darren Aronofsky's first two films, Pi (1998) and Requiem for a Dream (2000), specifically Brighton Beach for the latter. Darren Aronofsky grew up in Brighton Beach.
- In the film The Pick-Up Artist, Molly Ringwald's character lives in Coney Island, right across from Nathan's Famous Hot Dogs.
- In Remo Williams: The Adventure Begins, Remo Williams (played by Fred Ward) is seen doing workout exercises on the Wonder Wheel, as well as playing boardwalk games on Coney Island.
- In Sinners' Holiday (1930) with James Cagney and Joan Blondell, the story is set on Coney Island. The film was based on the play Penny Arcade.
- In the 1982 film Sophie's Choice, the characters played by Meryl Streep, Kevin Kline and Peter MacNicol spend "Dress-Up Sunday" at Coney Island. Prior to this, Sophie exclaims "Coney Island - Oh boy!" with unparalleled enthusiasm.
- In the 1928 silent film Speedy, Harold Lloyd spends a day at Coney Island with his girlfriend.
- In the 1948 film Texas, Brooklyn and Heaven, Mandy (Florence Bates) takes Eddie (Guy Madison) to Coney Island where Perry (Diana Lynn) works in swimsuit in an amusement booth.
- The 2008 film Two Lovers is set in Brighton Beach.
- The 2005 film Unknown White Male begins with the lead character waking up in Coney Island with a sudden case of retrograde amnesia.
- In the 2003 film Uptown Girls, Dakota Fanning's character runs off to Coney Island.
- Woody Allen's 2017 film titled Wonder Wheel with Kate Winslet, the film is set in 1950s Coney Island.
- In 2017 film Wonder, Coney Island was featured in a small, but important role: the beach was the favorite place of the main character's sister, Via, because that is where she often hangs out with her now deceased grandma. Coney Island appears in a flashback and in Via's "lonely day" where she remembers her grandma.
- Spider-Man's final battle against the Vulture in Spider-Man: Homecoming takes place at Coney Island.
- In the opening scenes of the 2013 post-apocalyptic science fiction film Oblivion, the Cyclone and the Wonder Wheel are seen damaged sixty years after an alien invasion destroyed New York City.
- In the 2009 film Push, Nick (Chris Evans) met Kira (Camilla Belle) at Coney Island and a photograph of the two of them there becomes part of the film's plot.
- In the 2015 film Brooklyn, Eilis and Tony visit Coney Island.
- The 2024 film IF heavily features Coney Island’s iconography, as the Memory Lane Retirement Home, where imaginary friends live, is located there.
- The 1928 film Lonesome showcases the beach, amusement park rides, and boardwalk as the main characters meet and fall in love there.

=== In television ===
- In The Marvelous Mrs. Maisel episode "Rumble on the Wonder Wheel" features a scene where the characters converse while riding the Wonder Wheel
- The 1950s television show Mickey Spillane's Mike Hammer, starring Darren McGavin, features an episode called "Coney Island Baby", which takes place amidst the amusement parks.
- The Naked City 1958 first-season episode; 'Burst of Passion' features a desolate closed down off season Coney Island as the final hiding place of a psychopath random killer (Woodrow Parfey) being hunted down and shot dead by Det. Jimmy Halloran, played by James Franciscus.
- The American Dragon: Jake Long episode, "Flight of the Unicorn" (November 3, 2005), features Jake, Trixie, and Spud taking a vacation at Coney Island and discovering an actual unicorn on display, which they try to rescue and send to its herd in Central Park.
- In a Dora the Explorer episode, "We All Scream for Ice Cream" (2000), Dora and Boots go to "Coney Island". A title referenced to peninsular neighborhood and entertainment area of a same name.
- In The Golden Girls episode, "Sophia's Wedding" (1988), Sophia mentions that her late husband Sal and his business partner used to run a pizza & knish stand at Coney Island.
- In the Seinfeld episode "The Subway" (January 8, 1992), Jerry Seinfeld travels to Coney Island to retrieve his stolen car, but ends up just going on the rides.
- Several episodes of The Sopranos have scenes at Coney Island, including the episode "Where's Johnny?"(March 21, 2004).
- In an Ugly Betty episode, Gio takes Betty and DJ (Daniel Junior) to Coney Island to hide from his grandparents, who are going to take him back to France.
- The Wizards of Waverly Place episode, "Detention Election" (March 19, 2010), contains a B-story wherein Jerry Russo, Max Russo, and Harper get stuck on a Ferris wheel at Coney Island.
- In the animated comedy series Futurama, protagonist Philip J. Fry, a New York City native, attended "Coney Island Community College". In the second episode of the series, "The Series Has Landed", the crew make a delivery to a theme park on the moon called Luna Park, a parody of Coney Island's Luna Park.
- Coney Island is the setting for the Wonder Pets episode "Save the Squirrel!", wherein the Pets saved a baby squirrel from a Ferris wheel and then from the Cyclone roller coaster.
- Coney Island was the base for Dr. Blowhole in the Penguins of Madagascar episode, "Dr. Blowhole's Revenge".
- In The Path Season 1, Episode 8 "The Shore", Eddie Lane (Aaron Paul) and your son Hawk travel to Coney Island's and the Wonder Wheel appears.
- In the third season of The Strain, Eph wanted to exchange from a book to a boy, resulting in a fight in the Coney Island water.
- Coney Island is the home of hacker collective fsociety, in the drama-thriller series, Mr. Robot. Scenes were also shot on Coney Island's Wonder Wheel.
- Coney Island was the first location visited during the final leg of The Amazing Race 21, where the final three teams had to find a clue hidden in plain sight on the Riegelmann Boardwalk.

=== In theater ===
- Neil Simon's 1983 play Brighton Beach Memoirs (also a 1986 movie) depicts growing up in the Coney Island area, and features scenes with the Coney Island rollercoaster in the background.
- Love Never Dies, the sequel to The Phantom of the Opera, takes place on Coney Island. It opened in London on March 9, 2010.
- The climax of the 1944 musical On the Town (also a 1949 film of the same name), by Leonard Bernstein, Betty Comden and Adolph Green, takes place at Coney Island.
- The 1954 musical By the Beautiful Sea, by Arthur Schwartz and Herbert and Dorothy Fields, is set in Coney Island.
- Herb Gardner's 1968 play The Goodbye People is set in Coney Island, as is its 1984 film adaptation.

=== In video games ===
- Both the Genesis and the SNES versions of the 1995 Spider-Man game have a level set on Coney Island.
- The 1988 pinball machine Cyclone is based on the Cyclone roller coaster at Coney Island.
- In the video game Grand Theft Auto IV and its episodes The Lost and Damned and The Ballad of Gay Tony, also produced by Rockstar Games, a take on Coney Island, "Firefly Island", is featured in the game, complete with an amusement park, and a take on both the Cyclone, Parachute Jump and Wonder Wheel.
- Much like the film, Rockstar Games' adaptation of The Warriors is based in a miniaturized version of Coney Island as well as other parts depicted in the film.
- Coney Island is the setting for Coney Island: The Hunt in The Division 2.
- Coney Island is featured in the level "Crisis at Coney Island" in Teenage Mutant Ninja Turtles: Shredder's Revenge.
- Coney Island appears in Marvel's Spider-Man 2.
- In Pokémon Black and White, Nuvema Town is based on Coney Island.

=== In social media ===
Two catchphrase recorded on Coney Island by the NYC web series “Sidetalk” have gone viral: "Bing Bong" and "Joe Byron; What's up, baby? Take me out to dinner." (said by a homeless man)

== By location ==
=== Steeplechase Park ===
- Steeplechase Park plays an important role in the novel Closing Time (1994) by Joseph Heller.
- Steeplechase Park is the setting for the 1953 film "Little Fugitive," about a seven-year-old boy who runs away to Coney Island.
- Steeplechase Park is the setting for Frederick Forsyth's book The Phantom of Manhattan, the basis for Andrew Lloyd Webber's Love Never Dies, his sequel to The Phantom of the Opera.
- The 1928 silent comedy film Speedy contains footage of Steeplechase Park's rides.

=== Luna Park (1903–1944) ===
- Roscoe Arbuckle's 1917 film Coney Island features Luna Park.
- The 1928 Oscar-nominated King Vidor film The Crowd includes a double date sequence filmed at Luna Park.
- Part of Harold Lloyd's 1928 film Speedy was shot at Luna Park.
- The song "Meet Me Down At Luna, Lena" was recorded by Billy Murray in 1905 to promote the park, among others. The song was rerecorded for the 2007 documentary film Welcome Back Riders.

=== Dreamland ===
- Artist Philomena Marano created a body of work inspired by the park in the papier collé method, American Dream-Land.
- A fictionalized Dreamland serves as a major setting in Disney's 2019 live-action adaptation of Dumbo. The film references the electrical fire, but is not historically accurate to the actual events: in Dumbo, the fire took place in 1919, and Dreamland was owned by V. A. Vandevere, a fictional character.
- Kevin Baker wrote a historical novel, Dreamland, about life in New York City at the time Dreamland existed, touching on the politics, economics, social conditions of the time, and Dreamland is one of the central places in the book. His book also contains a description of the fire.
- Dutch writer J. Bernlef's novel De witte stad (The White City) narrates about the fictional lives of many Dreamland inhabitants.
- Dutch writer Arthur Japin's novel De grote wereld (The Big World), about two midgets, is partly set in Dreamland.
- Dutch architect Rem Koolhaas writes at length on Dreamland in his retroactive manifesto for Manhattan, Delirious New York.
- Dutch writer Peter Verhelst's novel Geschiedenis van een berg (History of a mountain) about a park based on Dreamland, called 'Droomland' (Dreamland).
- Henry Miller mentions Dreamland in his novel, Tropic of Capricorn.
- Steven Millhauser, in his short story "Paradise Park", also talks about Dreamland as a rival amusement park. There are some similarities between Paradise Park and Dreamland.
- Fannie Flagg, in "Standing in the Rainbow", referred to Dreamland as being 'so big they had an entire little town there'.
- American author Alice Hoffman writes about Dreamland in her 2014 novel of historical fiction entitled "The Museum of Extraordinary Things." The book is set in New York City in the early 1900s and includes the Dreamland fire in the plot, as well as the Triangle Shirtwaist Factory fire.
- American author Christopher Bram sets the last part of his novel at Dreamland, in his 2000 novel of historical fiction entitled "The Notorious Dr. August: His Real Life and Crimes." The major character of the novel is conceived as one of the major "acts" at Dreamland in an extensive treatment of the setting.
- Tom Waits wrote the song "Tabletop Joe" in which the title character is himself part of the freak show exhibit, "a man without a body," but Joe becomes rich and famous as a part of the Dreamland show, and after being shunned, after joining Dreamland, he now feels that he is where he belongs.
- Brian Carpenter wrote a play treatment which he used as a springboard for lyrics and compositions behind his second studio album for Beat Circus entitled Dreamland. Carpenter's Dreamland is a 150-page score and song cycle interwoven with Carpenter's fictional tale of an impoverished, alcoholic gold miner who makes a pact with the devil before fleeing eastward to work in Dreamland's sideshows. The album featured Todd Robbins, alumnus of Coney Island, and its booklet includes historical images of Dreamland donated by the Coney Island Museum.
