= Ghost Train Orchestra =

American musical group; jazz and chamber ensemble

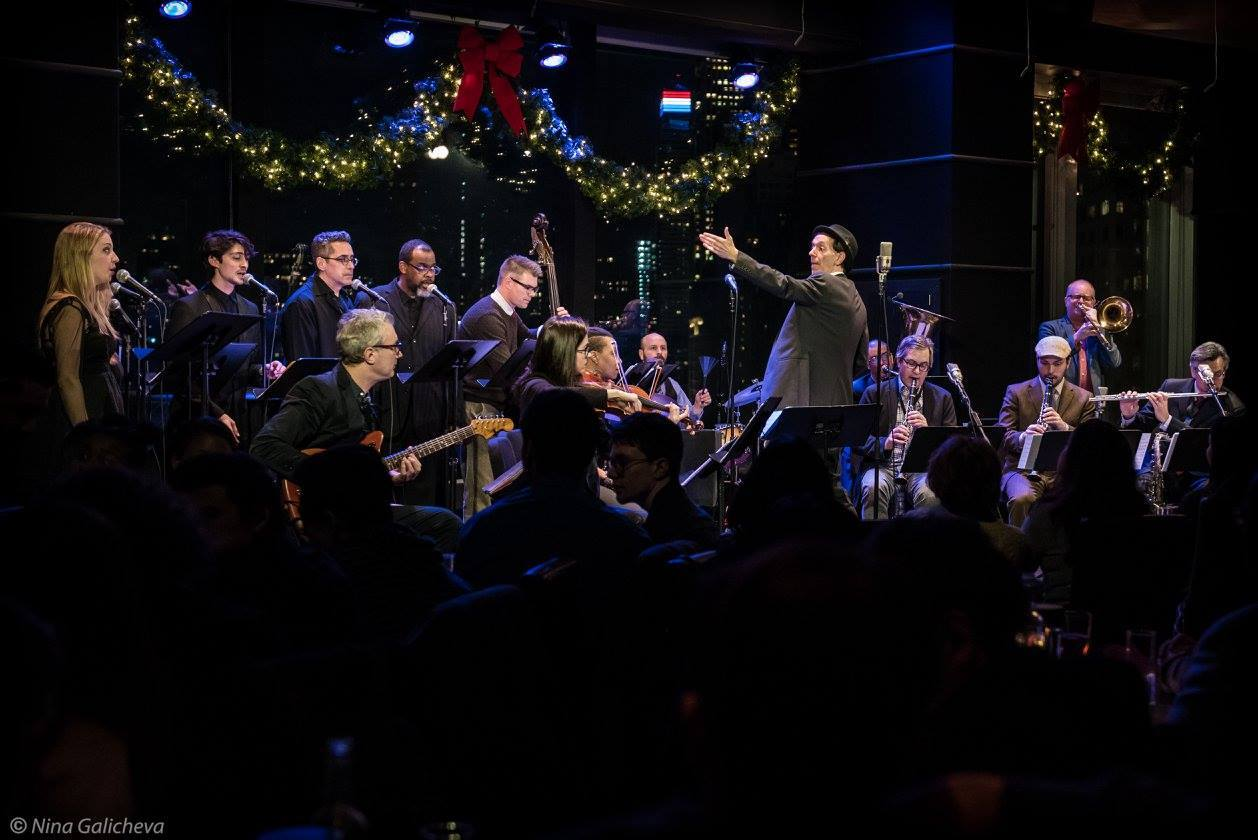
- Ghost Train Orchestra with choir, 2018

Background information
- Origin: Brooklyn, New York, U.S.
- Genres: Jazz; Classical; avant-garde jazz
- Years active: 2006–present
- Members: Brian Carpenter; Matt Bauder; Ron Caswell; Rob Garcia; Curtis Hasselbring; Andy Laster; Dennis Lichtman; Mazz Swift; Emily Bookwalter; Avi Bortnick; Brandon Seabrook; Michael Bates; Chris Lightcap

Ghost Train Orchestra is a New York City-based large ensemble led by Brian Carpenter. The band formed in 2006 when an historic theater in Boston commissioned Carpenter as musical director for its 90th year celebration. For the commission, Carpenter transcribed and arranged a set of overlooked music from late 1920s Chicago and Harlem and formed a side project from his regular band Beat Circus to perform it. The following year the group started performing under the name Ghost Train Orchestra.

== Recordings ==
The band first recorded in 2009 at Avatar Studios in Manhattan and released Hothouse Stomp in 2011 on Accurate Records. The album featured Carpenter's rearrangements and often avant-garde treatments of early jazz from the 1920s and 1930s, drawn from recordings by such artists as Tiny Parham, Charlie Johnson, Fess Williams, and McKinney's Cotton Pickers.

The band's 2013 album, Book of Rhapsodies, featured chamber-jazz works from the 1930s and '40s culled from found 78s and rediscoveries by music historians and collectors such as Mitchell Kaba and Irwin Chusid. The album included compositions by Raymond Scott, Reginald Foresythe, John Kirby, and Alec Wilder.

Hot Town, issued in 2015, contained more arrangements and reimaginings by Carpenter of 1920s and '30s vintage jazz. Book of Rhapsodies Vol. II, issued in 2017, featured more works by Scott, Foresythe, and Wilder.

In 2023, the band collaborated with Kronos Quartet on the album Songs and Symphoniques: The Music of Moondog. In April 2024, they performed the album's repertoire with Kronos Quartet live at New York's Town Hall, with guest vocals by David Byrne, Karen Mantler, and others. The album won the Preis der deutschen Schallplattenkritik (German Record Critics’ Award) 2024 Annual Award presented to ten outstanding music and spoken word productions.

In 2024 David Byrne was inspired to enlist Ghost Train Orchestra to work on his new album Who Is the Sky? after hearing their Moondog album and attending their record release show in New York City. David sent demos to Brian Carpenter and over a period of several months, Ghost Train Orchestra members worked with David and producer Kid Harpoon to arrange the music for orchestra. David and the band recorded the music over several days in New York City.

== Members ==
Note: Personnel changes slightly from project to project

- Brian Carpenter – trumpet, harmonica, vocals, musical director
- Curtis Hasselbring – trombone, guitar
- Ron Caswell – tuba
- Andy Laster – alto saxophone, flute
- Matt Bauder – tenor and baritone saxophone, bass clarinet, guitar
- Dennis Lichtman – clarinet
- Sara Schoenbeck - bassoon
- Mazz Swift – violin, vocals
- Sara Caswell – violin
- Katie Kresek - violin
- Emily Bookwalter – viola
- Alex Waterman – cello
- Avi Bortnick – guitar
- Brandon Seabrook – guitar, banjo
- Michael Bates – double bass
- Chris Lightcap – double bass, electric bass
- David Cossin – marimba, percussion
- Rob Garcia – drums

== Discography ==
- Hothouse Stomp (2011) – Music from late 1920s Chicago and Harlem
- Book of Rhapsodies (2013) – Carpenter's reimagining of chamber jazz from the late 1930s
- Hot Town (2015) – More music from late 1920s Chicago and Harlem, with guest Colin Stetson
- Book of Rhapsodies, Vol. II (2017) – More rearrangements of chamber jazz from the late 1930s for orchestra and choir
- Songs and Symphoniques: The Music of Moondog (2023) – Collaboration with Kronos Quartet reimagining the music of Louis Hardin aka Moondog
- Who Is the Sky? (2025) – David Byrne with Ghost Train Orchestra
