= Hothouse Stomp =

Studio album by Brian Carpenter's Ghost Train Orchestra
- Released: March 2011
- Recorded: November 2009
- Studio: Avatar (New York, New York)
- Genre: Jazz
- Length: 53:12
- Label: Accurate Records
- Producer: Danny Blume; Brian Carpenter

Ghost Train Orchestra chronology
Hothouse Stomp (2011)	Book of Rhapsodies (2013)

Hothouse Stomp is the debut album by Brian Carpenter's Ghost Train Orchestra featuring new arrangements of previously obscure music from late 1920s Chicago and Harlem, specifically Tiny Parham, Charlie Johnson, Fess Williams, and McKinney's Cotton Pickers. It was released on the Accurate Records label in 2011.

== Track listing ==
All music transcribed and arranged by Brian Carpenter.

1. "Ghost Train (Orchestra)" (Brian Carpenter, Brandon Seabrook) – 1:36
2. "Mojo Strut" (Tiny Parham) – 2:55
3. "Stop Kidding" (John Nesbitt) – 2:30
4. "Gee Baby, Ain't I Good To You?" (Don Redman, Andy Razaf) – 3:43
5. "Voodoo" (Tiny Parham) – 3:01
6. "Blues Sure Have Got Me" (Charlie Johnson) – 3:42
7. "Hot Bones and Rice" (Charlie Johnson) – 4:49
8. "Dixie Stomp" (B. Tremaine) – 2:59
9. "Lucky 3-6-9" (Tiny Parham) – 1:59
10. "The Boy in the Boat" (Charlie Johnson) – 4:40
11. "Slide, Mr. Jelly Slide" (Fess Williams) – 2:16
12. "Hot Tempered Blues" (Charlie Johnson, Arthur Porter) – 4:09

== Personnel ==
- Brian Carpenter – trumpet, harmonica, conductor
- Andy Laster – alto saxophone
- Matt Bauder – tenor saxophone, alto saxophone, clarinet
- Dennis Lichtman – clarinet
- Curtis Hasselbring – trombone
- Mazz Swift – violin, vocals
- Jordan Voelker – viola
- Brandon Seabrook – banjo
- Ron Caswell – tuba
- Rob Garcia – drums

== Reception ==
Professional ratings
Review scores
Source	Rating
Allmusic	4/5 stars

The Allmusic review by Rick Anderson stated "The music gathered and interpreted on this thoroughly winning disc all comes from a period before the emergence of the big-band jazz sound, a time when horn sections were smaller, rhythm sections less strictly codified, and the jazz sound itself much less regimented and refined. Just about every track is full of those kinds of musical treats and surprises, and it all adds up to a relentlessly rollicking good time." The album peaked at #10 on the Billboard jazz charts in April 2011.
