= Who Is the Sky? =

Studio album by David Byrne with Ghost Train Orchestra
- Released: September 5, 2025
- Genre: Art pop
- Length: 37:33
- Label: Matador
- Producer: Kid Harpoon

David Byrne chronology
American Utopia on Broadway (2019)	Who Is the Sky? (2025)	The Twits (2025)

Ghost Train Orchestra chronology
Songs and Symphoniques: The Music of Moondog (2023)	Who Is the Sky? (2025)

Singles from Who Is the Sky?
- 1. "Everybody Laughs" Released: June 11, 2025; 2. "She Explains Things to Me" Released: July 16, 2025; 3. "The Avant Garde" Released: August 13, 2025; 4. "What Is the Reason for It?" Released: September 3, 2025

Professional ratings
Aggregate scores
Source	Rating
Metacritic	76/100
Review scores
Source	Rating
AllMusic	4/5 stars
The Arts Desk	4/5 stars
Classic Rock	4/5 stars
Mojo	4/5 stars
musicOMH	4/5 stars
Paste	7.9/10
PopMatters	8/10
Rolling Stone	3.5/5 stars
The Skinny	4/5 stars
Uncut	4/5 stars

Who Is the Sky? is a studio album by American rock musician David Byrne with the New York City-based musical ensemble Ghost Train Orchestra, being their ninth and sixth studio album respectively. The album was released on September 5, 2025, by Matador Records.

== Recording ==
David Byrne began working on Who is the Sky? in the years following the conclusion of his American Utopia era, which included a successful Broadway run and a Spike Lee–directed HBO special. Reflecting on his creative process, Byrne said, "At my age, at least for me, there's a 'don't give a shit about what people think' attitude that kicks in. I can step outside my comfort zone with the knowledge that I kind of know who I am by now and sort of know what I’m doing". He described each song as "a new adventure", often beginning with simple acoustic demos and looped beats.

As Byrne accumulated a stockpile of rudimentary songs, he envisioned the emotional core of the material being brought out through orchestral arrangements. "I suspected that intimate orchestral arrangements would bring out the emotion I sense is there in these songs", he explained, citing the desire to balance personal reflection with accessibility. To achieve this, Byrne collaborated with music producer Kid Harpoon, whom he credited with helping convey his unique artistic vision.

The album features contributions from Ghost Train Orchestra, as well as guest appearances by St. Vincent, Hayley Williams of Paramore, and Tom Skinner of the Smile. Speaking about the album's lead single, "Everybody Laughs", Byrne said, "Someone I know said, 'David, you use the word "everybody" a lot'. I suppose I do that to give an anthropological view of life in New York as we know it. Everybody lives, dies, laughs, cries, sleeps and stares at the ceiling". Kid Harpoon added, "These songs are personal, but with David's unique perspective on life in general... He gets the absurdity of it all".

== Tour ==
Along with the album announcement and first single, David Byrne announced the Who Is the Sky? Tour on June 11, 2025, spread across 2025 and 2026. The 2025 dates are primarily focused on the US with a three-day stop in Canada, whereas the 2026 dates tours Australasia, Europe, and the UK. While Byrne has performed in the US extensively with his residency at St. James Theatre, this is the first time he has performed in Australasia and Europe since the American Utopia Tour in 2018. The tour uses 13 musicians, singers, and dancers – some from the American Utopia Tour – to achieve a show that "blends visual art, storytelling, and music into one compelling live performance".

In August 2026, Byrne announced the performances in his hometown of Baltimore had been recorded for a concert film, also titled Who Is The Sky?, directed by Brady Corbet.

== Track listing ==
All tracks are written by David Byrne.

No.	Title	Length
1.	"Everybody Laughs"	3:48
2.	"When We Are Singing"	3:24
3.	"My Apartment Is My Friend"	3:03
4.	"A Door Called No"	2:35
5.	"What Is the Reason for It?" (featuring Hayley Williams)	3:11
6.	"I Met the Buddha at a Downtown Party"	3:14
7.	"Don't Be Like That"	3:01
8.	"The Avant Garde"	3:42
9.	"Moisturizing Thing"	2:42
10.	"I'm an Outsider"	3:32
11.	"She Explains Things to Me"	2:19
12.	"The Truth"	3:02
Total length:		37:33

Apple Music version & Japanese edition (bonus track)
No.	Title	Artist	Length
13.	"DefCon"	David Byrne	1:18
Total length:			38:53

== Personnel ==
Credits adapted from Tidal.

=== David Byrne and Ghost Train Orchestra ===
- David Byrne – lead vocals (all tracks), acoustic guitar (tracks 1, 2, 4, 7, 11), programming (2, 5–7, 10, 11), synthesizer (3), electric guitar (9, 12)
- Matt Bauder – saxophone (1, 2, 4, 6, 7, 10), tenor saxophone (3, 12), guitar (5), bass clarinet (8, 9, 11)
- Emily Bookwalter – violin
- Brian Carpenter – trumpet
- Ron Caswell – tuba (1, 3, 4, 6–12)
- Sara Caswell – violin
- David Cossin – marimba (1, 3, 10–12), percussion (4, 5, 9), vibraphone (6), congas (7), glockenspiel (8)
- Curtis Hasselbring – trombone
- Katie Kresek – viola
- Andy Laster – alto saxophone (1, 2, 4, 6–12), tenor saxophone (5)
- Dennis Lichtman – clarinet
- Chris Lightcap – bass guitar (1–4, 8, 10–12), acoustic bass guitar (5–7)
- Ginevra Petrucci – flute (1, 3, 4, 10)
- Mauro Refosco – percussion (1, 3, 5, 7, 12)
- Sara Schoenbeck – bassoon
- Brandon Seabrook – electric guitar (1–3, 5, 7–12)
- Tom Skinner – djembe (1), drums (2–4, 6, 7, 9, 10, 12), percussion (5)
- Alex Waterman – cello

=== Additional contributors ===
- Kid Harpoon – production (all tracks), programming (1–9, 11, 12), synthesizer (1, 2, 12), drums (3), acoustic guitar (4, 8, 10), bass guitar (6, 7, 9), percussion (11)
- Brian Rajaratnam – engineering (all tracks), piano (11)
- Spike Stent – mixing
- Emily Lazar – mastering
- Annie Clark – vocals (1)
- Emi Trevena – keyboards (3), electric guitar (8)
- Rebecca El Saleh – concert harp (4)
- Rob Garcia – drums (5, 11), snare drum (10)
- Hayley Williams – vocals (5)
- Alex Soppp – flute (6, 8)

== Charts ==
=== Weekly charts ===
Weekly chart performance for Who Is the Sky?
Chart (2025)	Peak position
Australian Albums (ARIA)	18
Austrian Albums (Ö3 Austria)	11
Belgian Albums (Ultratop Flanders)	7
Belgian Albums (Ultratop Wallonia)	35
Croatian International Albums (HDU)	1
Dutch Albums (Album Top 100)	17
German Pop Albums (Offizielle Top 100)	8
Irish Albums (IRMA)	76
Irish Independent Albums (IRMA)	10
Japanese Albums (Oricon)	40
Japanese Rock Albums (Oricon)	11
Japanese Top Albums Sales (Billboard Japan)	52
New Zealand Albums (RMNZ)	17
Portuguese Albums (AFP)	75
Scottish Albums (Official Charts)	4
Swedish Physical Albums (Sverigetopplistan)	16
UK Albums (Official Charts)	34
UK Independent Albums (Official Charts)	7
US Billboard 200	172
US Independent Albums (Billboard)	28
US Top Rock & Alternative Albums (Billboard)	41

=== Year-end charts ===
Year-end chart performance for Who Is the Sky?
Chart (2025)	Position
Croatian International Albums (HDU)	3

== Release history ==
Release history and formats for Who Is the Sky?
Region	Date	Format	Label	Ref.
Various	September 5, 2025	Streaming; Digital download	Matador Records	
United States	September 5, 2025	Vinyl (Black, Lemon Yellow, Cantaloupe Orange / Strawberry Pink split, and Apple Green (Indie Exclusive)); CD	Matador Records	
