= The Luxe =

2007 novel by Anna Godbersen

- Cover of The Luxe
- Author: Anna Godbersen
- Cover artist: Karen Pearson
- Language: English
- Series: The Luxe series
- Genre: Young adult, Drama, Romance
- Publisher: HarperCollinsPublishers
- Publication date: November 20, 2007
- Publication place: United States
- Media type: Print (Hardcover)
- Pages: 433
- ISBN: 978-0-06-134568-5
- Followed by: Rumors: A Luxe Novel

The Luxe is a 2007 young adult novel by author Anna Godbersen. It follows the lives of two upper class sisters in Manhattan during 1899. There are four books in the Luxe series including Luxe, Rumors, Envy, and Splendor.

== Plot ==
Elizabeth Holland and her best friend Penelope Hayes rule Manhattan's social scene. But when Elizabeth learns her family's status is far from secure, suddenly everyone is a threat to a golden future. Elizabeth is forced into an engagement to Henry Shoonmaker, a man she barely knows, with a terrible reputation as a ladies man, who happens to be the person Penelope is in love with.

To complicate matters Elizabeth's headstrong little sister Diana also falls head over heels in love with Henry, who develops feelings for her as well. Meanwhile, Elizabeth is secretly in love with her childhood friend Will, her family's coachman... but so is Elizabeth's maid Lina who will do anything to win Will's love.

== Characters ==
=== The Socialites ===
- Elizabeth Holland must choose between the family duty of an arranged marriage and true love. Elizabeth, 18 years old, is described as angelic, with ash blond hair and brown eyes. She does everything she is told, and obeys her mother. She secretly spends long passionate nights with her stable boy, Will, but she has to marry Henry Schoonmaker to save her family from becoming poor.
- Diana Holland considers herself the romantic Holland sister. Diana is a 16-year-old with a rebellious streak that, Elizabeth believes, stems from the fact that she did not have a very refined coming-out party. Diana has wild, chestnut brown curls and features similar to her sister, pale skin and brown eyes. Diana is not one to follow rules, but she is often seen with her nose in a book, her only escape from what she thinks is a dull and ridiculous life. She falls in love with her sister's fiancé, Henry Schoonmaker.
- Penelope Hayes is beautiful, conceited, and ambitious. Penelope has dramatic blue eyes, full red lips, pale skin, and dark hair. Her only real feelings for Henry Schoonmaker are for his money, prestige, and his impeccable handsomeness, which she covets for her own. His decision to marry Elizabeth shocks her, but she quickly recovers and schemes to get him back; as she tells it, she would rather see Elizabeth dead before she marries Henry. Determined to look out for her own welfare, her schemes are for her personal gain.
- Henry Schoonmaker is the most well-known bachelor on New York's social scene. He is exceedingly handsome and charming, with dark hair that is always neatly pomaded to the right, golden skin, an elegant aristocratic jawline, and dark, worldly eyes. His father, who wants to run for mayor, decides that Henry needs to marry, arranging for him to wed Elizabeth Holland. While at the Hollands' house he becomes infatuated with Diana Holland. Known for his trouble maker's lilt, free spirited, and often spotted with a drink in hand, he has had relationships with many women in New York, including Penelope Hayes.
- Teddy Cutting is a kind, wealthy young man who has had a crush on Elizabeth for many years. He's light-hearted and proposed to Elizabeth twice without being taken seriously. He is the good friend of Henry Shoonmaker and the more sensible of the two. Teddy has blond hair and serious gray eyes.

=== The Lower Society ===
- William Keller is Elizabeth's secret lover who works for the Holland family as their coachman and valet. He loves her and wants her to come away with him to California. Elizabeth isn't sure about leaving her life and running away. He is also very handsome with dark hair, blue eyes, and a crooked nose.
- Lina Broud is Elizabeth Holland's maid. Lina has served Elizabeth for years, but the friendship they used to cherish as children has disappeared since Elizabeth's arrival on the social scene. She is desperately in love with Will, and when Lina discovers Elizabeth's engagement to Henry, she soon harbors hatred for her because Lina also knows of Elizabeth's secret love affair with Will. Lina has plain brown hair, sage green eyes, and freckled skin. She is later fired by Elizabeth. Shortly after her dismissal, Lina allies with Penelope Hayes over the prospect of gossip regarding the former's social rival, Elizabeth.
- Claire Broud is Lina's older sister. Claire is a proper maid who relishes the gossip of the upper class and is truly fond of Diana, her mistress. Despite her love of gossip, she is very loyal to the Hollands. Claire is described as having red hair and a pale face.

== Reception ==
The novel had a positive response from readers, staying on the New York Times Bestsellers list in December 2007 for four weeks. However, some reviewers focused on the novel's flaws.

In 2011, Gossip Girl's producers began development of the series into a motion picture. "The producers see the movie as a young Moulin Rouge, a music-driven story featuring contemporary artists and fashion set against a period backdrop."

== Bibliography ==
- Godbersen, Anna. The Luxe. HarperCollinsPublishers: New York, 2007. ISBN 978-0-06-134568-5
