= Songs and Symphoniques: The Music of Moondog =

Songs and Symphoniques: the Music of Moondog

Studio album by Ghost Train Orchestra and Kronos Quartet
- Released: September 29, 2023
- Recorded: 2023
- Genre: Classical
- Length: 1:02:49
- Label: Cantaloupe Music
- Producer: Brian Carpenter

Ghost Train Orchestra chronology
Book of Rhapsodies, Vol. II (2017)	Songs and Symphoniques: the Music of Moondog (2023)	Who Is the Sky? (2025)

Kronos Quartet chronology
My Lai (2022)	Songs and Symphoniques: the Music of Moondog (2023)	Outer Spaceways Incorporated (2024)

Songs and Symphoniques: The Music of Moondog is a collaboration album between Kronos Quartet and Ghost Train Orchestra reimagining the music of American classical composer Louis Hardin, AKA Moondog. Several songs are arranged by Ghost Train Orchestra members and the album features a cast of guest vocalists.

== Background ==
Leading up to the album's release were the release of two singles; "High on a Rocky Ledge" (feat. Marissa Nadler) and "Why Spend a Dark Night with You?" (feat. Joan as Police Woman)

== Critical reception ==
The album won the Preis der deutschen Schallplattenkritik (German Record Critics’ Award) 2024 Annual Award presented to ten outstanding music and spoken word productions.

== Track listing ==
No.	Title	Length
1.	"Theme"	3:52
2.	"Be a Hobo" (feat. Rufus Wainwright)	3:45
3.	"High on a Rocky Ledge" (feat. Marissa Nadler)	4:33
4.	"Caribea"	2:04
5.	"Why Spend a Dark Night With You?" (feat. Joan as Police Woman)	3:38
6.	"Enough About Human Rights" (feat. Karen Mantler)	3:41
7.	"I’m This, I’m That" (feat. Jarvis Cocker)	3:41
8.	"Speak of Heaven"	4:20
9.	"The Viking of 6th Avenue"	5:30
10.	"Down is Up" (feat. Petra Haden)	1:26
11.	"Coffee Beans" (feat. Karen Mantler and Brian Carpenter)	4:10
12.	"Behold" (feat. Sam Amidon and Aoife O'Donovan)	4:30
13.	"Choo Choo Lullaby" (feat. Brian Carpenter)	3:26
14.	"Fog on the Hudson"	1:19
15.	"See the Mighty Tree" (feat. Petra Haden)	1:24
16.	"Bumbo"	5:17
17.	"All is Loneliness" (feat. Joan as Police Woman)	6:13
Total length:		1:02:49

== Personnel ==
=== Ghost Train Orchestra ===
- Brian Carpenter – trumpet, vocals, arranger, producer
- Curtis Hasselbring – trombone, arranger
- Ron Caswell – tuba
- Andy Laster – alto saxophone, flute, arranger
- Matt Bauder – tenor saxophone, bass clarinet, arranger
- Colin Stetson – bass saxophone
- Dennis Lichtman – clarinet
- Sara Schoenbeck – bassoon
- Brandon Seabrook – guitar
- Chris Lightcap – double bass, bass guitar
- Rob Garcia – drums, percussion
- David Cossin – marimba, percussion
- Maxim Moston – violin, arranger

=== Kronos Quartet ===
- David Harrington – violin
- John Sherba – violin
- Hank Dutt – viola
- Sunny Yang – cello

=== Featured Artists ===
- Moondog – composer
- Rufus Wainwright – vocals
- Marissa Nadler – vocals
- Joan Wasser – vocals
- Karen Mantler – vocals, harmonica
- Jarvis Cocker – vocals
- Petra Haden – vocals
- Sam Amidon – vocals, banjo
- Aoife O'Donovan – vocals

=== Engineering ===
- Zach Miley – engineer
- Aaron Nevezi – engineer
- Marc Urselli – engineer
- John Kilgore – mix engineer
- Brian Montgomery – mix engineer
- Bob Ludwig – master engineer
