= Splendor =

Splendor or splendour (see spelling differences) may refer to:

== Arts and entertainment ==
- Splendor (game), a card-based board game published in 2014 by Marc André
- Splendour (play), a 2000 play by Abi Morgan
- Splendor: A Luxe Novel, a 2009 novel by Anna Godbersen

=== Films ===
- Splendor (1935 film), an American film
- Splendor (1989 film), an Italian film by director Ettore Scola
- Splendor (1999 film), a film by Gregg Araki
- American Splendor (2003 film), an American biographical film by Harvey Pekar

=== Music ===
- Splender an alternative rock band from New York City

== Ships ==
- Carnival Splendor, a cruise ship
- HMS Rosebay (K286), previously known as the USS Splendor
- London Splendour, two tanker ships of London & Overseas Freighters, the second of which is now the Front Splendour owned by Frontline Shipping

== Other uses ==
- Splendour (apple), a cultivar developed in New Zealand
- Splendor (cycling team), a professional cycling team active during the 1980s
- Hero Honda Splendor, a motorcycle

== See also ==
- Splendor in the Grass (disambiguation)
- Splenda, an artificial sweetener
- Splender, rock band from New York City, New York, USA
