= DJ Hazard =

DJ Hazard may refer to:

- DJ Hazard (comedian) (born 1953), American stand-up comedian and musician
- DJ Hazard (musician) (born 1977), British drum and bass DJ and producer
