= Boy from Black Mountain =

Boy From Black Mountain

Studio album by Beat Circus
- Released: September 29, 2009
- Recorded: 2008–2009 at Camp Street Studios in Cambridge, MA
- Genres: Americana; dark cabaret; indie rock
- Length: 46:24
- Label: Cuneiform Records
- Producers: Brian Carpenter, Bryce Goggin, Sean Slade

Beat Circus chronology
| Dreamland (2008) | Boy From Black Mountain (2009) | These Wicked Things (2019) |

Professional ratings
Review scores
| Source | Rating |
|---|---|
| Allmusic | 3.5/5 stars |
| Boston Phoenix | 3.5/4 stars |
| PopMatters | 9/10 stars |

Boy From Black Mountain is the third studio album by Beat Circus. It marks the second release in songwriter Brian Carpenter's Weird American Gothic trilogy. Several songs on the album were inspired by Carpenter's response to his son's autism, Southern Gospel music, and Southern Gothic storytelling. Larkin Grimm provides guest vocals throughout the album. Album artwork was created by Portland artist Carson Ellis.

== Track listing ==
All tracks are written by Brian Carpenter.

1. "The February Train" - 4:16
2. "The Life You Save May Be Your Own" - 2:59
3. "Boy From Black Mountain" - 5:48
4. "Clouds Moving In" - 1:25
5. "Petrified Man" - 3:43
6. "As I Lay Dying" - 4:13
7. "Saturn Song" - 3:27
8. "The Course of the River" - 1:45
9. "The Quick and the Dead" - 5:00
10. "The Sound and the Fury" - 4:11
11. "Judgment Day" - 3:55
12. "Nantahala" - 3:48
13. "Lullaby For Alexander" - 1:59

== Personnel ==
Beat Circus

- Brian Carpenter - Lead Vocals, Harmonica, Accordion, Piano, Trumpet, Harmonium
- Paran Amirinazari - Violin, Backing Vocals
- Jordan Voelker - Viola, Backing Vocals
- Paul Dilley - Upright Bass, Acoustic Guitar
- Andrew Stern - Electric Guitar, Banjo
- Doug LaRosa - Trombone
- Ron Caswell - Tuba
- Gavin McCarthy - Drums

Additional musicians

- Bill Cole - Chinese Suona
- Larkin Grimm - Vocals
- Julia Kent - Cello
- Ellen Santaniello - Voice
