= Dreamland (Beat Circus album) =

Studio album by Beat Circus
- Released: January 29, 2008
- Recorded: 2006 in New York City
- Genre: Experimental, Dark cabaret, Balkan, Mariachi
- Length: 45:06
- Label: Cuneiform Records
- Producer: Martin Bisi, Brian Carpenter

Beat Circus chronology
Ringleaders Revolt (2004)	Dreamland (2008)	Boy From Black Mountain (2009)

Professional ratings
Review scores
Source	Rating
Allmusic	3.5/5 stars
The Boston Globe	(mixed)
Kathodik	4/5 stars
Musique Machine	4/5 stars
Ondarock	7/10 stars
The Washington Post	(mixed)

Dreamland is the second studio album by American band Beat Circus. It was released on January 29, 2008 by Cuneiform Records, and shares its title with the turn-of-the-century Coney Island theme park which burned in a devastating fire in 1911. The album is a 150-page score for 9 musicians composed and arranged by Brian Carpenter and produced by Martin Bisi. Album artwork was created by Brian Dewan, who also performed electric zither on the album. Dreamland marks the first installment of Carpenter's Weird American Gothic trilogy.

== Track listing ==
All music and lyrics by Brian Carpenter, except "Dark Eyes" and "Meet Me Tonight in Dreamland". Recorded in 2006 by Martin Bisi at his B.C. Studios in Brooklyn, New York.

1. "Gyp the Blood" – 2:22
2. "The Ghost of Emma Jean" – 4:43
3. "Hypnogogia" – 1:02
4. "Delirium Tremens" – 4:06
5. "Lucid State" – 1:04
6. "Death Fugue" – 3:11
7. "The Good Witch" – 0:44
8. "Dark Eyes" – 3:01
9. "Slavochka" – 4:08
10. "The Gem Saloon" – 3:26
11. "El Torero" – 1:20
12. "The Rough Riders" – 4:19
13. "Coney Island Creepshow" – 3:32
14. "Hell Gate" – 2:37
15. "Meet Me Tonight in Dreamland" – 3:07
16. "March of the Freaks" – 2:24

== Musicians ==
- Brian Carpenter - Vocals, Harmonica, Pump Organ, Trumpet, Toy Piano, Tambourine, Slide Trumpet, Percussion
- Alec K. Redfearn - Accordion, Jawharp
- Brandon Seabrook - Tenor Banjo, Slide Guitar, Mandolin
- Kaethe Hostetter - Violin, Viola
- Julia Kent - Cello
- Briggan Krauss - Alto Saxophone, Baritone Saxophone
- Matt McLaren - Drums, Brake Drums, Washboard, Percussion
- Ron Caswell - Tuba
- Curtis Hasselbring - Trombone
- Brian Dewan - Electric Zither
- Chris Jenkins - Viola
- Steven Berson - Cello
- Helen Yee - Violin
- Michael Hearst - Theremin
- Sxip Shirey - Bells, Triple-Extended Pennywhistle, Breath Blasts
- Jesse Sparhawk - Harp
- Todd Robbins - Upright Piano
- Frank Difficult - Electronics
- Orion Rigel Dommisse - Vocals
- Holly Brewer - Vocals
- M@ McNiss - Vocals
- DJ Hazard - Outside Talker

== Performances ==
Brian Carpenter, Alec K. Redfearn, Kaethe Hostetter, Julia Kent, Brandon Seabrook, Briggan Krauss, Curtis Hasselbring, Ron Caswell, and Matt McLaren performed this material live in 2006 at several music venues in NYC, including Tonic, Brooklyn Academy Of Music, and Barbes.

== Trivia ==
- Brian Dewan contributed the cover illustration and played electric zither on "Coney Island Creepshow", "Hell Gate", and "March Of The Freaks".
- Magician, sideshow performer, and Coney Island alum Todd Robbins performed on "Meet Me Tonight In Dreamland" on an upright solo piano in Martin Bisi's B.C. Studios.
- Veteran stand-up comedian DJ Hazard performed on "Coney Island Creepshow" as the outside talker.
