= Outer Spaceways Incorporated =

Outer Spaceways Incorporated: Kronos Quartet & Friends Meet Sun Ra

Studio album by Kronos Quartet
- Released: June 21, 2024
- Genre: Jazz
- Label: Red Hot Records

Kronos Quartet chronology
Songs and Symphoniques: The Music of Moondog (2023)	Outer Spaceways Incorporated: Kronos Quartet & Friends Meet Sun Ra (2024)

Outer Spaceways Incorporated is a 2024 album by the Kronos Quartet of covers of Sun Ra songs. It features many other artists including Marshall Allen of the Sun Ra Arkestra, Laurie Anderson, Jlin, Laraaji, RP Boo, 700 Bliss, Armand Hammer, Terry Riley.

The string quartet provides an "eclectic and suitably experimental interpretation of the jazz legend's music." Many tracks include samples and remixes of Sun Ra and the Sun Ra Arkestra.

The album is the fourth in a series of Sun Ra cover albums, released by the Red Hot Organization.

== Track listing ==
No.	Title	Writer(s)	Length
1.	"Outer Spaceways Incorporated"	Kronos Quartet, Georgia Anne Muldrow, Jacob Garchik	2:55
2.	"Maji"	Jlin, Kronos Quartet	3:32
3.	"Daddy's Gonna Tell You No Lie"	Laraaji, Kronos Quartet	5:35
4.	"Images Suite (Images / Horoscope / Ancient Aiethopia / Interstellar Low Ways)"	Steven Bernstein, Laurie Anderson, Marshall Allen, Doug Wieselman, Sexmob, Kronos Quartet	9:35
5.	"The Furthest Out Things"	Nicole Lizée, Kronos Quartet	3:55
6.	"Phenomenon"	Laurie Anderson, Marshall Allen	2:20
7.	"Black Body Radiance"	Zachary James Watkins, Corey Fogel, Raffi Garabedian, Kronos Quartet	5:45
8.	"Blood Running High"	RP Boo, Armand Hammer	3:56
9.	"The Wuz"	Laurie Anderson, Marshall Allen	3:03
10.	"Secrets of the Sun"	700 Bliss (Moor Mother, DJ Haram)	4:20
11.	"Love in Outerspace"	Trey Spruance, Secret Chiefs 3	5:17
12.	"Three Seasons on the Tempestuous Twelve Inch Planet"	Victoria Shen (Evicshen)	3:34
13.	"Kiss Yo' Ass Goodbye"	Terry Riley, Sara Miyamoto, Paul Wiancko, Kronos Quartet	9:41
