= Alec K. Redfearn =

American musician and composer

- Performing with the Eyesores in Washington, D. C., 2012

Background information
- Instruments: accordion, synthesizer
- Years active: c. 1991–present

Alec K Redfearn is a musician and composer based in Providence, Rhode Island. He has composed music for dance, theater, and film. His primary instrument is the accordion. Most notable is his body of compositional work for The Eyesores, a genre-bending ensemble of unorthodox instrumentation which spawned in the mid-1990s and whose music spans old-time Americana, Appalachian, folk and Eastern European music.

He composed the soundtrack for, and had a small acting role in, the 2004 film, Stay Until Tomorrow, by Providence-based director, Laura Colella. In 2005 he was awarded the MacColl Johnson Fellowship from the Rhode Island Foundation.

He has also developed a unique style of playing the accordion, introducing elements commonly associated with the guitar such as distortion, drone, and noise. He has performed on accordion and recorded in several ensembles of which he also composes for, such as Amoebic Ensemble, Barnacled, and Beat Circus.

== Discography ==
=== Albums ===
Alec K. Redfearn and the Seizures

- Exterminating Angel (Corleone Records, 2009)

Alec K. Redfearn and the Eyesores

- The Eyesores (Self-released, 1998)
- May You Dine on Weeds Made Bitter By the Piss of Drunkards (Magic Eye Singles, 1999)
- Bent at the Waist (Handsome Records, 2002)
- Every Man For Himself and God Against All (Corleone Records, 2003)
- The Quiet Room (Cuneiform Records, 2005)
- The Smother Party (North East Indie Records, 2006)
- The Blind Spot (Cuneiform Records, 2007)
- Sister Death (Cuneiform Records, 2012)
- The Opposite (Cuneiform Records, 2018)

Beat Circus

- Ringleaders Revolt (Innova Records, 2004)
- Dreamland (Cuneiform Records, 2008)

Barnacled

- 6 (Corleone Records, 2003)
- Table 12 (7 inch single, White Denim Records, 2004)
- Charles (ESP-Disk, 2008)

Amoebic Ensemble

- Space Heater EP (QORQ Productions, 1991)
- Amoebic Ensemble EP (QORQ Productions, 1993)
- Driving Music EP (Simply Indefensible, 1994)
- Road to World Domination (Simply Indefensible, 1995)
- Limbic Rage (1995)
- Radio Free Amoebica (Simply Indefensible, 1996)
- Amoebiasis (Stupeur Et Trompette, 1998)
