= New and Used =

New and Used was a jazz quintet based in New York City. The group was active from 1989 to 1996 and recorded two albums.

== History ==
New and Used was established in 1989 with trumpeter Dave Douglas as a central figure. The other members included violinist Mark Feldman, alto saxophonist Andy Laster, drummer Tom Rainey, and double bass player Kermit Driscoll. The group was particularly active at the Knitting Factory where it gave most of its performances. The ensemble was active through 1996 and then disbanded.

Critic Tom Moon writing for The Philadelphia Inquirer wrote, "There isn't a convenient label for the music of New and Used... It's angular, disciplined compositions borrow from Anthony Braxton and Bela Bartok, while the interactive moments — particularly those featuring Dave Douglas and violinist Mark Feldman — display the sense of theme development found in classic jazz. Jason Ankeny writing for AllMusic stated, the New and Used was "a group which attempted to find common ground between the polar opposites of notated and improvised music."

New and Used recorded two albums Souvenir (1992) and Consensus (1995). In reviewing the latter album in the context of Douglas's wider disccography, Dave Rubien of the San Francisco Chronicle wrote "The Consensus disc is a bit more troublesome and points to a problem that is somewhat endemic to the New York alterna-jazz community: overcomposition. There's no question these players can sit in with the best of them. But the music, while frequently achieving an intriguing blend of art music and funk, is more often than not too cultured to achieve lift-off."
