= Amoebic Ensemble =

- Origin: Providence, Rhode Island
- Genres: Experimental music
- Years active: 1992–1998
- Labels: Stupeur et Trompette!
- Past members: Alec K. Redfearn; Shawn Wallace; Jonathan Thomas; Matthew Everett; Laura Gulley; Steve Jobe; Paige Van Antwerp

Amoebic Ensemble (or The Amoebics) was an instrumental band in the 1990s, from Providence, Rhode Island, headed by Alec K. Redfearn, who wrote the music and arrangements for the group, and played accordion. The band emerged from the remnants of Redfearn's former band, Space Heater.

Although the band members referred most often to their style as experimental music, their music has been characterized as free jazz, and as punk jazz. Their music has also been compared to that of Frank Zappa.

Their album Amoebiasis, although recorded in Providence in late 1996 and early 1997, was released on the French record label Stupeur et Trompette! The people who ran the label also organized the Mouvement Internationale des Musiques Innovatrices experimental music festival, and took notice when Amoebic Ensemble performed there in 1996. The album was produced by Tom Buckland, except for "Lay Down in the Road", which was produced by Joe Auger.

Subsequent to Amoebiasis's release, primarily as a result of members being busy in other music projects, percussionists Paige Van Antwerp and Jonathan Thomas, as well as trumpeter Shawn Wallace all left the band. Gerry Heroux took over as trumpeter, and Mark Pedini joined on drums. Matthew Everett changed from bouzouki and mandolin to electric guitar instead.

== Members ==
- Alec K. Redfearn – accordion, vocals
- Shawn Wallace – trumpet
- Jonathan Thomas – percussion
- Matthew Everett – bouzouki, mandolin, electric guitar
- Laura Gulley – violin
- Steve Jobe – bassoon, hurdy-gurdy, vocals
- Paige Van Antwerp – drums

== Discography ==
Limbic Rage

Studio album by Amoebic Ensemble
- Released: 1995

=== Limbic Rage ===
1. "Chapter 11" - 3:11
2. "Birdfight" - 1:06
3. "Limbic Rage" - 2:20
4. "The Circus Has Been Cancelled" - 2:50
5. "Tango" - 3:35
6. "Gimme a Buck or I'll Touch You" - 5:54
7. "Boilermaker" - 3:52
8. "Repetitive Motion Sickness" - 2:20
9. "Three-Ring Bathtub" - 3:24
10. "What I Did Last Summer" - 2:58
11. "Scratch" - 6:08
12. "Owls Are Actually Very Stupid" - 2:39
13. "Tertullian Dance" - 2:26
14. "Mayday in the Tunnel / Waxing Neuralgic" - 9:00

Amoebiasis

Studio album by Amoebic Ensemble
- Released: 1998

=== Amoebiasis ===
1. Wire Up - 1:20
2. Big Head Of A Tom - 1:57
3. Amoebiasis - 5:24
4. Devil's Picnic - 3:08
5. Ubu U - 5:00
6. Why Are We Whispering? - 2:13
7. Downtown - 5:35
8. Palindrome - 1:30
9. Who's That Glamourpuss? - 1:42
10. Lelonia - 2:07
11. Lay Down In The Road - 6:41
