= Blackballed: The Bobby Dukes Story =

- Poster
- Directed by: Brant Sersen
- Written by: Brant Sersen; Brian Steinberg
- Produced by: Peter Gelles; Chris Lechler; Brant Sersen; Brian Steinberg
- Starring: Rob Corddry; Paul Scheer; Dannah Feinglass; Rob Riggle; Rob Huebel; Ed Helms; Curtis Gwinn; Seth Morris; DJ Hazard
- Edited by: Chris Lechler; Paul Grass
- Distributed by: The 7th Floor
- Release date: March 12, 2004 (SXSW)
- Running time: 91 minutes
- Country: United States
- Language: English

Blackballed: The Bobby Dukes Story is a 2004 sports slapstick film by Brant Sersen in his directorial debut, written by Brian Steinberg and Sersen. It is an improvisational comedy set in the world of paintball. It stars Rob Corddry, Paul Scheer, Dannah Feinglass, Rob Riggle, Rob Huebel, Ed Helms (in his film debut), Curtis Gwinn, Seth Morris and DJ Hazard.

== Plot ==
Paintball's first superstar, Bobby Dukes, led his team, the River Rats, to an unprecedented three consecutive victories at The Hudson Valley National Paintball Classic. On May 28, 1993, the River Rats were competing for their fourth "Classic" victory when disaster struck. Bobby, attempting one of his signature moves, was shot. Desperate to stay in the game, Dukes intentionally wiped the paint from his jersey, thus committing paintball's most heinous crime. A zealous referee spotted the wipe and ejected Bobby from the game. The three-time champ was embarrassed, went to Venezuela, and left the game for 10 years while being the laughingstock of the paintball community. Deemed a cheater, disgraced and humiliated, Bobby disappeared. Ten years later an older and wiser Dukes returns to reclaim his title and erase the memory of his tainted past. He enters the 2003 Classic but finds no self-respecting paintball player will be caught dead on his team. On the verge of giving up hope, Bobby joins forces with the most unlikely of allies... the referee that caught him cheating. Now, the two improbable partners must recruit a team of paintball misfits and take back the Hudson Valley Paintball Classic taking place at Liberty Paintball in Patterson, New York.

== Reception ==
=== Critical reception ===
Metacritic, which uses a weighted average, assigned the film a score of 54 out of 100, based on 12 critics, indicating "mixed or average" reviews. On the review aggregator website Rotten Tomatoes, 53% of 19 critics' reviews are positive, with an average rating of 5.40/10.

=== Awards ===
The film won the Audience Award at the 2004 South By Southwest Film Festival and the 2005 Boston Independent Film Festival.
