= Brian Carpenter (musician) =

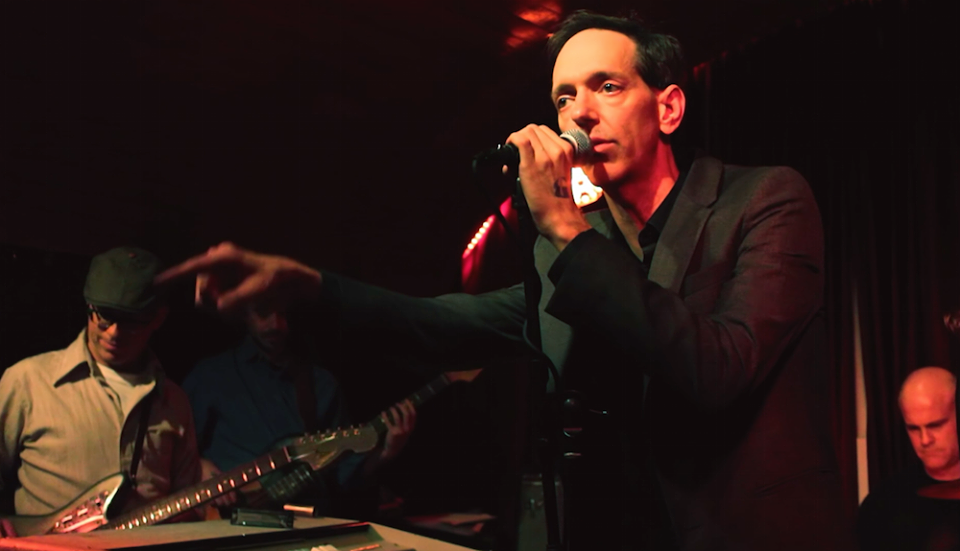

Background information
- Born: Melbourne, Florida, U.S.
- Genres: Alternative rock; folk rock; jazz; alternative country
- Occupations: Singer-songwriter, producer, radio producer, engineer, multi-instrumentalist
- Instruments: Vocals, Trumpet, Harmonica
- Years active: 1998–present

Brian Carpenter is an American musician, songwriter, composer, arranger, producer, and radio host. He is the lead singer and songwriter for the Boston, Massachusetts band Beat Circus. In 2011, he formed Brian Carpenter & The Confessions and released its debut album in 2015. He is also a founder and musical director of Ghost Train Orchestra in Brooklyn.

== Musical career ==
=== Beat Circus ===
After the formation of Beat Circus in 2002, Carpenter began composing a "Weird American Gothic" trilogy of albums, starting with Dreamland, released on the Cuneiform label in 2008, a song cycle loosely based on the Coney Island theme park of the same name. Boy from Black Mountain followed in 2009 with Southern folk songs inspired by his son and his father's life growing up as a farmer in the Florida Panhandle. The album won the Independent Music Award that year for Best Alt/Country Album. In 2012 Carpenter began collaborating with the Berkeley Repertory Theater on a musical loosely based on Herbert Asbury's Gold Rush saga The Barbary Coast.

=== Ghost Train Orchestra ===
In 2006 Carpenter was hired as the musical director for a run of vaudeville shows at an historic theater in Boston, then celebrating its 90th anniversary. He formed a 9-piece band called the Ghost Train Orchestra to perform the event and in 2011 released an album of rearranged music from obscure late 1920s Chicago and Harlem bands called Hothouse Stomp. The ensemble went on to reconstruct and re-imagine compositions by idiosyncratic American composers from the late 1930s with the album Book of Rhapsodies and the music of Moondog with Kronos Quartet on the album Songs and Symphoniques: The Music of Moondog.

In 2024 David Byrne was inspired to enlist Ghost Train Orchestra to work on his new album Who Is the Sky? after hearing their Moondog album and attending their record release show in New York City. Byrne sent demos to Carpenter and over a period of several months, Ghost Train Orchestra members worked with David and producer Kid Harpoon to arrange the music for orchestra. David and the band recorded the music over several days in New York City.

=== Brian Carpenter & The Confessions ===
In 2011 Carpenter announced the formation of a new band called Brian Carpenter & The Confessions which debuted in January 2011 in Biddeford, Maine. The band recorded their debut The Far End of the World with Rafi Sofer at Q Division Studios in Somerville, Massachusetts and mixed with Craig Schumacher in Tucson, Arizona. The album was released in 2015.

== Radio ==
In 2001, Carpenter began hosting a weekly radio program Free Association on WZBC at Boston College. He then began producing lengthy radio documentaries, starting with The Sound of Horror, a four-hour study on sound design in horror and science-fiction film. Among other projects, Carpenter aired documentaries on jazz multi-instrumentalist and composer Sam Rivers and composer, inventor, and electronic music pioneer Raymond Scott.

== Discography ==
=== Beat Circus ===
- Ringleaders Revolt (2004)
- Dreamland (2008)
- Boy From Black Mountain (2009)
- These Wicked Things (2019)

=== Brian Carpenter and the Confessions ===
- Blind (2012)
- The Far End of the World (2015)

=== Ghost Train Orchestra ===
- Hothouse Stomp (2011)
- Book of Rhapsodies (2013)
- Hot Town (2015)
- Book of Rhapsodies Vol II (2017)
- Songs and Symphoniques: The Music of Moondog (2023) with Kronos Quartet
- Who is the Sky? (2025) with David Byrne

=== Appears on ===
- Swans, My Father Will Guide Me Up a Rope to the Sky (2010)
- Kronos Quartet, Long Time Passing (2020)
- Thalia Zedek, Perfect Vision (2021)

== Radio Documentaries ==
- The Sound of Horror: Sound Design in Horror and Science-Fiction Film (2003, with Stephen Jay Schneider, Stephen Barden, Craig Henighan)
- Rivers and Rhythms: A Sam Rivers Retrospective (2012, with Allan Chase, Steve Coleman, Russ Gershon, and Dave Holland)
- Imagination and Innovation: The World of Raymond Scott (2012, with Irwin Chusid, Tom Rhea, Jim Thirlwell)
- Ennio Morricone: Magician of Sound (2020, with Alessandro De Rosa)
