= Rumors: A Luxe Novel =

2008 novel by Anna Godbersen

- Cover of American hardcover
- Author: Anna Godbersen
- Language: English
- Series: The Luxe series
- Genre: Young adult, Drama, Romance
- Publisher: HarperCollins
- Publication date: 1 August 2008
- Publication place: United States
- Media type: Print (hardcover)
- Pages: 423 pp
- ISBN: 0-06-134569-5
- OCLC: 229912096
- LC Class: PZ7.G53887 Ru 2008
- Preceded by: The Luxe
- Followed by: Envy: A Luxe Novel

Rumors is a young adult novel by author Anna Godbersen, first published in 2008 by HarperCollins. It is the second book in The Luxe series.

== Plot ==
The book begins with Elizabeth Holland in California with her runaway love, Will Keller. While Elizabeth is having a good time in California, her sister Diana is anything but happy. Diana is stuck in New York, being one of the only two people that knows that her sister's death is a hoax. The other person, Penelope Hayes, decides that she would like to marry the rich and famous Henry Schoonmaker, Elizabeth's ex-fiancé. Throughout the book, Diana and Henry have a secret relationship and plan on somehow marrying. Meanwhile, Elizabeth hears of her family's worsening financial situation, and she decides that she has to help them somehow, seeing as the reason they remain having these troubles is that she did not marry rich Henry. Elizabeth and Will take a train to New York and reveal themselves to her mother and aunt. Henry's father, William Schoonmaker, decides that for reputation's sake it would be a good idea for Henry to marry Penelope, who has been proving herself to be a very worthy socialite. Meanwhile, Lina Broud, the Holland's ex-maid, running out of money that she got from dishing Holland family secrets to Penelope, decides to move up the social scale with the help of Tristan, a tailor from the Lord & Taylor clothing store. With Tristan's help, she not only learns to act and dress like an educated lady but also meets and becomes the protegee of incredibly rich Mr. Carey Lewis Longhorn. Mr. Longhorn changes her name to Carolina Broad and develops a story about being an orphaned western heiress, and takes her to various parties where she officially meets Penelope Hayes. As a bribe to Penelope, whom Carolina wants as a friend to gain social status, Carolina tells Penelope of how Henry and Diana had had sex one night in Diana's own bedroom. Penelope uses this information to blackmail Henry into marrying her in order to protect Diana's reputation. The wedding happens so fast that Henry has no time to explain to Diana what happened so she is very depressed and angry. Also, a man named Snowden Cairns, a friend of the late Mr. Holland, comes and helps the Hollands out of some of their financial troubles. They all decide it is best if Elizabeth and Will are married and sent back to California to avoid scandal. Snowden marries Will and Elizabeth at the Holland Home. When they try to leave, at the train station, townspeople recognize the famous Elizabeth Holland and assume that Will has kidnapped her. They proceed to shoot Will, killing him, and returning Elizabeth to her home. The next day, it is all over society that Elizabeth Holland had been kidnapped by the old stable boy, and, conveniently, the Hollands decide to go with this story. The book ends with Henry and Penelope getting married, both Holland sisters heartbroken, and a promise to Diana from Elizabeth to get Henry back.

== Character list ==
Elizabeth Holland: Eldest Holland daughter, who fakes her death and runs away with Will Keller, the former stableboy, who later dies, leaving her heartbroken.

Diana Holland: Youngest Holland daughter. In love with Henry Schoonmaker, she is rebellious and open minded. She sells stories to a reporter in order to earn money.

Lina Broud/Carolina Broad: Former maid of the Hollands, living in a hotel. Currently under the care of Carey Lewis Longhorn, a very rich man who pays her bills. Gives Penelope information that leads to her blackmailing Henry into marrying her. She hopes to become wealthy in order to impress Will. She publicly says that she is an orphan and heiress.

Henry Schoonmaker: Rich heir to the Schoonmaker empire. Is married to Penelope Hayes but loves Diana Holland. He was formerly engaged to Elizabeth Holland. He is ridiculously handsome and enviable, and all of New York society is crazy for him.

Penelope Hayes: Married to Henry Schoonmaker. Former and Pretend best friend of Elizabeth Holland. Indebted to Carolina Broad.

Will Keller: Former stable boy of the Hollands. Ran away to California to be later followed by and married to Elizabeth Holland. Was once loved by Lina Broud. Is accused of kidnapping Elizabeth Holland and dies because of it.

Isaac Phillips Buck: one of Penelope's best friends, not rich but supposedly "valuable".

Carey Lewis Longhorn: An extremely rich elderly man who takes in Carolina Broad, knowing who she really is. He is famous for his collection of portraits of the beauties of New York, including Elizabeth Holland.

Teddy Cutting: Henry Schoonmaker's best friend. Had a crush on Elizabeth Holland.

Percival Coddington: a rich but clumsy man who comes on to all the debutantes.

Grayson Hayes: Penelope Hayes's older brother.

Aunt Edith: Diana and Elizabeth Holland's aunt who comes and lives with them after her marriage ended badly. One of the only divorcees that can function in 1899's society.

Snowden Cairns: A friend of the former Mr. Hollands. Takes care of Holland family when they hit financial trouble because he feels that he owes the late Edward Holland's family something.

Tristen Wrigely: works at the Lord & Taylor's clothing shop. Helps Lina Broud meet Carey Lewis Longhorn. He steals Lina's purse with all of her money in. He has a crush on Lina and kisses her in an elevator.

Isabelle Schoonmaker: Married to Henry Schoonmaker Sr. Secretly in love with Grayson Hayes, Penelope's elder brother.

Davis Barnard: Friend of Diana Holland who writes the Gamesome Gallant Column in the newspaper.
