= Splendor in the Grass (disambiguation) =

The phrase "splendor in the grass" originates in William Wordsworth's poem Ode: Intimations of Immortality (1802–1804): "Though nothing can bring back the hour / Of splendour in the grass, of glory in the flower; / We will grieve not, rather find / Strength in what remains behind."

As a proper name, the phrase may refer to:

- Splendor in the Grass, a 1961 film directed by Elia Kazan
- Splendor in the Grass (1981 film), a television remake of the original film
- Splendor in the Grass (album), a 2009 album by the American musical group Pink Martini
- Splendour in the Grass, an Australian music festival
