= Envy: A Luxe Novel =

2009 novel by Anna Godbersen

- Cover of American hardcover
- Author: Anna Godbersen
- Language: English
- Series: The Luxe series
- Genre: Young adult, Drama, Romance
- Publisher: HarperCollins
- Publication date: 1 February 2009
- Publication place: United States
- Media type: Print (hardcover)
- Pages: 405 pp
- Preceded by: Rumors: A Luxe Novel
- Followed by: Splendor: A Luxe Novel

Envy: A Luxe Novel is a young adult novel by author Anna Godbersen. It is the third book in The Luxe Series.

== Plot ==
Henry Schoonmaker, the handsome son of a wealthy tycoon, is now married to Penelope Hayes, due to her scheming. Henry refuses to even sleep in the same room as his new wife, as he remains infatuated with Diana Holland. Diana Holland is heartbroken about the marriage, but she acts to appear genuine and gay at the many balls and parties she is obligated to attend to, in order to preserve her family's reputation. She continues to avoid any confrontations with Henry. Her sister, Elizabeth Holland, grieves over the loss of her true love, while growing weaker and more fragile every day. Carolina Broad, a maid turned socialite, is content befriending a wealthy elderly gentleman, Mr. Carey Lewis Longhorn, who continues to provide for her financially.

The characters' paths once again intertwine when Henry plans a fishing trip to Florida with his good friend, Teddy Cutting. However, Penelope invites herself along, and offers Carolina Broad the invitation, as well. At a luncheon hosted by the Hollands, Penelope extends the invitation once more to her once good friend, Elizabeth Holland. Meanwhile, Henry confronts Diana on the Holland porch, and explains his piteous situation with Penelope. He then asks her to find a way to secretly meet him in Florida, where they may possibly be together. When Diana returns to the luncheon, Elizabeth presses Penelope to allow her sister to join them, as well.

The group of socialites, along with Penelope's older brother, Grayson Hayes, and another member of New York's elite, Leland Bouchard, travel south to Florida, where they vacation on the beach. Before they arrive, Penelope pulls her brother aside and asks him to play a bit with the younger Holland's heart strings. She then claims the reason for the trouble is mere amusement, but her hidden intentions become clear when she suspects Henry and Diana have planned the trip for their own romantic affairs. However, Penelope's scheme backfires when her brother begins to legitimately fall in love with Diana.

Meanwhile, Elizabeth and Teddy rekindle their lost friendship, and Teddy proposes for the third time to Elizabeth. However, when Elizabeth begins to feel a certain attraction to her friend, she is overwhelmed with guilt, due to her past love. Romance blooms further after Carolina discovers she has grown a bit too fond of Leland. Still, it seems Leland has taken a liking to her, as well. At the peak of their romantic expedition, Carolina receives news that Mr. Longhorn has passed on. She then returns to New York to attend his funeral, where she makes the miraculous discovery that he has left all of his estates and wealth to her. She shares this joyous reason with her good friend and part-time lover, Tristan Wrigley.

Back in Florida, Henry and Penelope continue to bicker and Penelope threatens Diana's reputation several times when the papers report of Penelope's marital insecurities. Nevertheless, Henry and Diana continue to meet secretly, and express their undying love to each other. Diana, however, feels as if Henry has seduced her into becoming his mistress, and before she has a chance to fully dismiss him, he quickly promises to leave Penelope.

Later, Teddy informs Henry that he plans on joining the army and will be shipped to the Philippines. A more worldly Henry then joins Grayson in the bar, where his brother-in-law expresses his love for Diana. Henry feels a ridiculous amount of pride for having claimed her heart, and returns to his hotel room in a drunken state to find Penelope bawling on the balcony. After making a futile attempt at comforting her, Penelope decides that she wants more, and Henry easily gives in to her seduction and they have sex.

Diana sees the enviable couple half-naked on their balcony, and assumes that Henry has deceived her. Heartbroken, Diana runs off into the early morning. Later, Henry tells Penelope that their love making was a mistake and he that never should have committed the act. He goes after Diana, who then confronts him, claiming that she no longer loves him. Henry is distraught.

After returning to New York, Penelope informs the guests at a Schoonmaker dinner party that she and Henry are expecting a child. Hearing this, a dejected Diana invites Grayson along for a walk through the mansion, where he professes his sincere love to her. He allows her to seduce him and they had sex, accidentally witnessed by a horrified Henry.

Meanwhile, Elizabeth discovers that she is pregnant with Will's child. When her mother demands she get an abortion, Elizabeth refuses, and plans to proceed with the pregnancy. Snowden, Mr. Holland's former business partner, is told of this and he proposes to her. Elizabeth accepts in order to avoid any scandalous rumors.

Later, Henry enlists in the army. He notifies a brutally shocked Penelope of this, and accuses her of her false pregnancy. He then sends Diana a long letter, professing his love to her and his apologies. In response, a determined Diana cuts her hair to pass as a man, and runs away to join the army in search of her love.

== Character List ==
Elizabeth Holland: Eldest Holland daughter and a young widow who discovers that she is pregnant with her deceased husband's child. She nearly has an abortion but decides against it when she realizes the child is the only way to keep some of Will with her always. She then marries Snowden Cairn in order to support her baby and avoid scandalous rumors. Described as petite, with long ash-blond hair, large brown eyes, and small plum-shaped lips.

Diana Holland: Youngest Holland daughter. Still in love with Henry Schoonmaker, she will do whatever it takes to get him back from Penelope. She has sex with Grayson and is caught by Henry. She then receives a letter from Henry saying that he's enlisted in the army. She cuts off her hair in order to follow him. Described as petite, with long, curly chest-nut brown hair, large brown eyes, and small plum-shaped lips.

Carolina Broad: New socialite who forced a friendship with Penelope Hayes. When her friend and caretaker dies suddenly, she inherits his entire fortune. Former servant of the Holland family; used to be in love with William Keller. Described as being thin with big-bony shoulders, large feet, sage green eyes, and mousy brown hair.

Henry Schoonmaker: Rich heir to the Schoonmaker estate. Married to Penelope Hayes, in love with Diana Holland. Enlists in the military after his friend Teddy. Described as being impeccably handsome with dark hair pomaded to the right, golden skin, and dark, worldly eyes.

Penelope Hayes: Married to Henry Schoonmaker. Former and pretend best friend of Elizabeth Holland. She lies to the Schoonmakers about being pregnant to avoid Henry divorcing her, but he doesn't believe her. He then enlists in the army, leaving her heartbroken and stuck in a bad situation, as she isn't pregnant. Described as being long and thin, with dark wavy hair, pale skin, large blue eyes, and plump red lips.

Carey Lewis Longhorn: Rich, but dies suddenly. Supports Carolina financially, in exchange for helping him relive his youth. He left Carolina his entire fortune, making her life much easier.

Teddy Cutting: Henry Schoonmaker's best friend, who enlists in the military. Has an interest in Elizabeth Holland. Described as handsome, with blond hair and serious, gray eyes.

Grayson Hayes: Penelope Hayes's older brother, who goes on the trip with the others. He has sex with Diana and appears to be in love with her. Viewed by most as the "wayward child" of the Hayes family. Described as handsome with dark hair, a thin moustache, and blue eyes spaced far apart.

Aunt Edith: Diana and Elizabeth Holland's aunt who comes and lives with them after her marriage ended badly. One of the only divorcees that can function in 1899's society.

Snowden Cairns: A friend of the late Mr. Edward Holland. Takes care of Holland family when they hit financial trouble because he feels that he owes them something. When he discovers of Elizabeth's pregnancy, he does what he can for her and marries her, knowing that they will only be man and wife for the sake of her child.
