= Anna Godbersen =

American writer (born 1980)

- Born: Anna Sophia Godbersen; April 10, 1980 (age 46); Berkeley, California
- Occupation: Novelist
- Writing career
- Period: 2007–present
- Genres: Young adult, drama, Romance
- Notable work: The Luxe series

Anna Godbersen (born April 10, 1980) is an American writer. She is the author of the series The Luxe, with The Luxe, the first book in the series, being her debut novel. The first book in her new series, Bright Young Things, was released on October 12, 2010.

== Personal life ==
Anna Godbersen was born in Berkeley, California, in 1980. She attended Berkeley High School in Berkeley, California. She was educated at Barnard College in Manhattan, and currently lives in Brooklyn, New York. One of her heroes is her mother, Suzanne Lacke.

== Bibliography ==
=== The Luxe ===
- The Luxe (November 20, 2007)
- Rumors (June 3, 2008)
- Envy (January 27, 2009)
- Splendor (October 27, 2009)

=== Bright Young Things ===
- Bright Young Things (October 12, 2010)
- Beautiful Days (September 20, 2011)
- The Lucky Ones (November 27, 2012)

=== Other works ===
- "The Blonde" (2014)
