= Splendor: A Luxe Novel =

2009 novel by Anna Godbersen

- Cover of American hardcover
- Author: Anna Godbersen
- Language: English
- Series: The Luxe Series
- Genre: Young adult, Drama, Romance
- Publisher: HarperCollins
- Publication date: 27 October 2009
- Publication place: United States
- Media type: Print (hardcover)
- Pages: 400
- ISBN: 978-0-06-162631-9
- OCLC: 436084539
- LC Class: PZ7.G53887 Sp 2009
- Preceded by: Envy: A Luxe Novel

Splendor is a young adult novel by Anna Godbersen in The Luxe series. The book is the fourth and final book in the series, and was published on October 27, 2009.

A spring turns into summer, Elizabeth relishes her new role as a young wife, while her sister, Diana, searches for adventure abroad. But when a surprising clue about their father's death comes to light, the Holland girls wonder at what cost a life of splendor comes.

Carolina Broad, society's newest darling, fans a flame from her past, oblivious to how it might burn her future. Penelope Schoonmaker is finally Manhattan royalty—but when a real prince visits the city, she covets a title that comes with a crown. Her husband, Henry, bravely went to war, only to discover that his father's rule extends well beyond New York's shores and that fighting for love may prove a losing battle.

In the conclusion to the Luxe series, New York's socialites chase dreams, cling to promises, and tempt fate.

== Plot Synopsis ==
Elizabeth Holland

Elizabeth Holland is enjoying her role as Snowden Cairn's wife when she discovers a mysterious note delivered to Mr. Cairns by a menacing yet familiar stranger. The note is linked to her father's death. It is soon revealed that Edward Holland secured the lot for in which Will and Elizabeth lived in during their short time in the West for Will (It is never revealed why Mr. Holland did this but Elizabeth suspects that he knew about their (Elizabeth and Will's) relationship). She confronts Snowden about the note and realizes he killed Mr. Holland in the Klondike, had Will Keller killed and married Elizabeth to gain control of the lot. Seeing that he is found out, Cairns covers Elizabeth's mouth with some fluid and heavily sedates her on a regular basis. When Teddy Cutting visits Elizabeth, she tries to call out 'help' to him, but she is quickly sedated by Cairns. One night, she manages to leave the confines of her room and as she goes down the stairs, she spots Cairns in the stairwell. He moves to attack her but she pushes him off the stairs to his death.

The next day, some police officials arrive at the Cairns' home to investigate Snowden's death. Teddy arrives as Elizabeth is on the verge of confessing to the murder and he tells the officials that Snowden simply fell from the stairs. One of the policemen is the man who delivered the note and Elizabeth realizes why he was so familiar: he was one of the policemen who gunned down Will. She threatens to expose him unless he leaves her be. The man agrees and departs. Teddy returns Elizabeth to her home and she tells him the whole story of her and Will. Both of them declare their feelings for each other and share a kiss. Elizabeth asks Teddy to name her child, whether boy or girl, Keller Cutting.

Diana Holland

Diana Holland is in Cuba, having been rejected by the army because she was a girl. She still has short hair (which she previously cut short in Envy) and has put out a fake story of her going to a finishing school in Paris. She is working in a bar and is reunited with her one true love, Henry Schoonmaker. After embarking on an adventure in the rain, they both return to Henry's barracks and sleep together. The next morning, both of them awaken to find Henry's superior, Colonel Cooper, in the room. The Colonel recognizes Diana as the society girl in the pages who was supposed to be in Paris. Fearing for his career, Cooper sends the two lovers back to New York. Diana is punished by her mother for leaving them and makes Edith Holland her chaperone. Her mother also wants Elizabeth to give Diana proper scolding. Diana also finds out that Penelope has been in the company of the visiting Prince of Bavaria and gives the newspaper small pieces about them to spite Penelope. When she goes to Elizabeth's new home, Elizabeth tells Diana to leave New York with Henry for they will never be together in the city. Diana proposes the plan to Henry and he agrees.

Henry publicly reveals his plans with Diana to his father and his father has a heart attack. William Schoonmaker's death delays Henry and Diana's plans to elope and what Henry said to his father is spread throughout New York. As Diana is attending Schoonmaker Sr.'s funeral, most of the guests are looking at her and gossiping about her.

Henry later goes to the Hollands' residence and tells Diana that he has inherited his father's estate and he wishes to marry her. Diana is overwhelmed and runs away from him. She writes Henry a note telling him that she will wait for him at the port so that they can go to Paris together. Henry receives the note a day late and he races to the port. He manages to catch Diana, tells her how much he loves her and proposes to her. Diana is overjoyed and accepts the proposal but is dismayed when Henry says they can stay here. She tells him that she wasn't threatening to leave New York because he didn't romantically propose to her but because she doesn't want to dine and see the people who think she is a tramp again and again. She finally says she wants to go to Paris. Henry says he will go wherever she goes but Diana says that he belongs in New York. She assures him that he will fall in love again and she will remember him forever as her first real love. They kiss passionately for the last time and she leaves on a boat for Paris.

Penelope Schoonmaker (née Hayes)

Society is wondering why Penelope is out and about while her husband is at war and why she has recovered quickly from her 'miscarriage'. Penelope is at a party in Carolina Broad's home when she sees the Prince of Bavaria. She notes that both of them have so much in common and goes to dance with him. Many of the guests are scandalized because she had the nerve to dance with him. The Prince seems to be attracted to her and regularly sends her flowers. As a result, Penelope becomes increasingly infatuated with the Prince.

When Henry returns, she continues to torment him with her knowledge of his and Diana's relationship. At a party, she threatens Henry once more to reveal the relationship to the public and Henry leaves her to go to his father. Penelope is quickly distracted by the arrival of the Prince and they dance again. The two go to a deserted corridor and kiss. But the prince seems to treat her as a trophy girlfriend because he kisses her roughly, as if he desires her body more than her, herself. Penelope dismisses this and continues to chase after him anyway.

After William Schoonmaker's funeral, she and the prince have a one-night stand in his hotel room. Henry wishes to divorce Penelope and she pays it no mind. She sends all of her things to her former home on Fifth Avenue and goes back to the hotel where the prince is staying at. She is informed by the hotel's staff that the prince left earlier that day for Bavaria. Outraged, Penelope begins to collapse and is humiliated when she hears one of the society ladies say 'the fallen Mrs. Schoonmaker'. She returns home in self-pity and humiliation but is surprised to find Henry there. She asks Henry why he is still there and Henry says Diana left without him. She becomes surprisingly sympathetic and comforts him. Henry asks her where the prince is and she tells him the prince used her. Henry remarks that they both made a mess of everything, which is why they deserve each other. Penelope agrees and they both drink to broken hearts.

Henry Schoonmaker

New York is under the impression Henry is off at war being a hero but he is actually in Cuba. His father had him stationed there because the place was isolated from the war and the place had minimal problems. Henry spends his days as a 'soldier' yachting with his superior, Colonel Cooper, whom he thinks is a blundering idiot. He is reunited with Diana Holland, his great love in a bar where Diana works. After embarking on a rainy day adventure, they return to his barracks and sleep together. Colonel Cooper recognizes Diana and has them both sent back to New York, fearing retribution from Henry's father. Upon his return, he is greeted as a war hero by society. He is disgusted that his father put out an image of him being a war hero while he was off in Cuba not having the military experience. His wife, Penelope threatens to make his and Diana's relationship public. Henry knows that Penelope is just incensed because his arrival claimed all of her attention. Diana tells Henry she wants to come away with him in order for them to be together. Henry finally summons up his courage to stand up to his father.

At a party, he is again threatened by Penelope but he dismisses this and tells her he wants to divorce her. When the prince arrives, he notices her distraction and goes off to his father. He finds him and tells him everything about his and Diana's relationship and that they are going to elope. Henry also tells his father what he thinks of his false public image and all the lies his father made. Schoonmaker Sr. is severely shocked and collapses. He later dies of a heart attack. Witnesses to Henry's declaration spread the story and society looks down on Diana. After the funeral, his father's will is read and states that the whole estate belongs to Henry. Henry goes to Diana to tell her that he has inherited his father's fortune and that he wants to marry her. Henry is dismayed when Diana runs away from him. He receives her note a day late but still manages to catch her. He proposes to her and an ecstatic Diana accepts. But when he says they will stay in New York, she returns the ring to him saying she cannot live like this in New York. She wants to go to Paris and Henry says he will go too. But she says that Henry belongs in New York and that he will fall in love again one day. She also tells him he will always be her first love. Before Henry can object, the boat starts to leave. He and Diana have one last kiss and she tells him goodbye.

Henry returns home resigned and miserable. He finds Penelope in the same state and they comfort each other. At the end of the novel, they both drink to broken hearts.

Carolina Broad (Lina Broud)

Carolina is society's darling and is enjoying a life she once thought impossible. She is in love with Leland Bouchard, a wealthy man who lives down the street. Although she is living in pure bliss, there is a threat to her glamorous life: Tristan, a former Lord & Taylor salesman who still has feelings for her. He tells her he is unhappy that she gets everything she wants while he remains empty handed. He reminds Carolina that were it not for him, she would never be where is she is now. He also threatens to expose her true origins to the public unless he is paid handsomely for what her did for her. Even after Carolina pays him, he still stalks her wherever she goes, especially when she is in the company of Leland Bouchard. As she is about to be exposed by Tristan, she dismisses him and Leland warns him never to come near her again.

Carolina accidentally confesses her feelings to Leland and he says that he feels the same way. He invites her to meet his family and she nervously agrees. When she meets the Bouchard family, they love her instantly. Leland arrives late and proposes to Carolina in front of his family. Wedding plans are made and Carolina invites her sister Claire to the wedding. On the day of the wedding, Tristan visits her again and threatens her. Leland bursts into the room and begins to beat Tristan. When he is about to give the final blow, Carolina screams for him to let Tristan go. Tristan leaves and Leland demands to know why Tristan is following them. She tells him the whole story and Leland leaves. Afterwards, the wedding is cancelled.

Leland returns and tells her what he thinks. He does not care whether she was a maid or not, but he was angered when he knew she lied to him about being an only child and that she didn't know Tristan. He tells her that he needs to be away from her for a while. Carolina is hurt and begs him to stay, saying she loves him. Leland responds by saying ' And I loved'you'

Word gets around that Carolina is not what everyone thought she was. One paper describes her act as the beginning of an age of wealth without class. She is devastated by the turn of events and Leland's departure and isolates herself in her home. Claire goes to her sister's home, hoping to comfort Carolina. But the sight of Claire makes Carolina even more ashamed because she had asked Claire to attend the wedding as a maid. Claire comforts Carolina and tells her that she cannot let what people think get in her way. She also says that the paper said that Carolina's act, although deceitful, would be the beginning of the future. Carolina brightens a bit at this. Her and Claire become the new social elites and the beginning of a new era.
