= Beat Circus =

American band

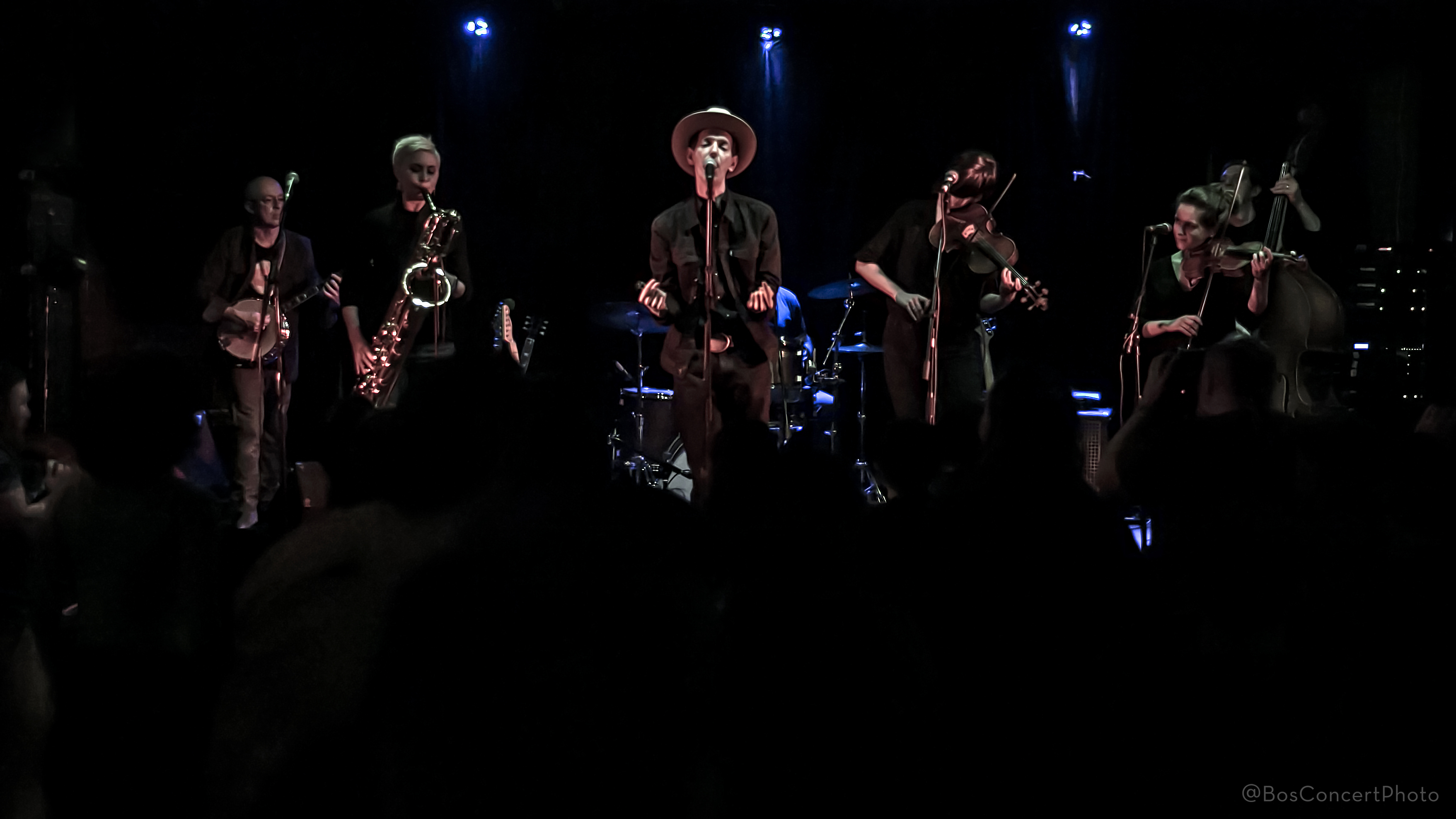
- Beat Circus performing in 2019

Background information
- Origin: Boston, Massachusetts, United States
- Genres: Dark cabaret; experimental
- Years active: 2002–present
- Labels: Cuneiform Records; Innova Records
- Members: Brian Carpenter; Paul Dilley; Andrew Stern; Gavin McCarthy; Abigale Reisman; Emily Bookwalter; Alec Spiegelman
- Past members: Paran Amirinazari; Leigh Calabrese; Ron Caswell; Curtis Hasselbring; Jim Hobbs; Kaethe Hostetter; Briggan Krauss; Matt McLaren; Alec K. Redfearn; Brandon Seabrook; Jordan Voelker

Beat Circus is a band from Boston, Massachusetts, US, fronted by the multi-instrumentalist / singer-songwriter Brian Carpenter, who has been its only constant member since its inception.

== Musical style ==
The band's songs are characterized by lush arrangements, eclectic instrumentation, and Carpenter's lyrical themes of love, death, religion, and American mythologies. The music draws heavily from disparate genres including experimental music, modern classical, cabaret, circus music, Appalachian string music, bluegrass music, old-time music, Southern Gospel and funereal music. Since 2005, Carpenter has been developing a "Weird American Gothic" trilogy of concept albums, starting with Dreamland.

== History ==
=== Early years and Ringleaders (2002–2004) ===
In 2001, Carpenter moved to Cambridge, Massachusetts, and formed a collaboration with the tenor banjo player Brandon Seabrook, which led to the first incarnation of Beat Circus, originally named Beat Science. Aided by Jim Hobbs (saxophone), Jerome Deupree (drums), Alec K. Redfearn (accordion), Ron Caswell (tuba) and Leigh Calabrese (musical saw), the group was a contemporary free improvisation instrumental ensemble which used circus music as a jumping off point. After a summer-long residency in Cambridge in 2003, Carpenter recorded the band's first album, Ringleaders Revolt, which was released by Innova Records in 2004.

=== Dreamland (2005–2006) ===
In 2005, Carpenter steered the band in an entirely different direction with the development of Dreamland, a 150-page through-composed score for nine musicians containing songs based around a stage play treatment of a story involving the turn-of-the-century Coney Island theme park which burned in a devastating fire in 1911. Dreamland began a shift away from instrumental music to narrative songs about children, dreams, fatherhood, revenge and redemption. To develop the Dreamland score, Carpenter formed a second incarnation of Beat Circus with Matt McLaren (drums), a long-time collaborator of Cuneiform Records label-mate Redfearn, Kaethe Hostetter from Boston, Curtis Hasselbring (trombone), Briggan Krauss of Sex Mob (saxophone), and original members Redfearn, Caswell and Seabrook. In 2006, Carpenter enlisted the New York City-based producer Martin Bisi to record and mix Dreamland in Brooklyn. Dreamland was released on Cuneiform Records in January 2008 and announced as the first installation in Carpenter's "Weird American Gothic" trilogy.

=== Boy from Black Mountain (2007–2009) ===
In late 2006 near the completion of recording Dreamland, Carpenter's son was diagnosed with autism. After coping with this, Carpenter began writing a song cycle for the second part of the trilogy, entitled Boy From Black Mountain. With the departure of Redfearn and McLaren, who wished to focus on their band The Eyesores, Carpenter formed the third incarnation of Beat Circus in 2007, casting himself as the lead vocalist with Paran Amirinazari(violin) and Jordan Voelker (viola) as background vocalists, and introducing a rockabilly-style rhythm section composed of Paul Dilley (upright bass), Andrew Stern (guitar/banjo) and Gavin McCarthy of Karate (drums). In 2008, Carpenter enlisted the producer Sean Slade to record Boy From Black Mountain in Boston. Later that year, the New York City-based producer and engineer Bryce Goggin was brought on to mix the album. Boy From Black Mountain marked yet another shift in direction, inspired by Carpenter's Southern heritage, Southern Gospel music, bluegrass music and Southern Gothic writers, and was released by Cuneiform Records in September 2009.

=== These Wicked Things (2014–present) ===
In 2014, Carpenter was commissioned by the Berkeley Repertory Theater to write music for The Barbary Coast, a play based on the true crime book by Herbert Asbury about the rise of San Francisco during the Gold Rush era. Two years after a week-long residency in Berkeley, California, the band recorded a few of the songs from the play and several other new songs and instrumentals for These Wicked Things, the third and final part of Carpenter's Weird American Gothic trilogy. Recorded in Boston and mixed in Tucson with Craig Schumacher, the record bridges a number of disparate genres including experimental music, cowpunk, post-punk, Mexican folk music, mariachi music and "spaghetti western" and giallo film scores.

== Discography ==
- Ringleaders Revolt (Innova Records, 2004)
- Dreamland (Cuneiform Records, 2008)
- Boy From Black Mountain (Cuneiform Records, 2009)
- These Wicked Things (Innova Records, 2019)
