= Matt Bauder =

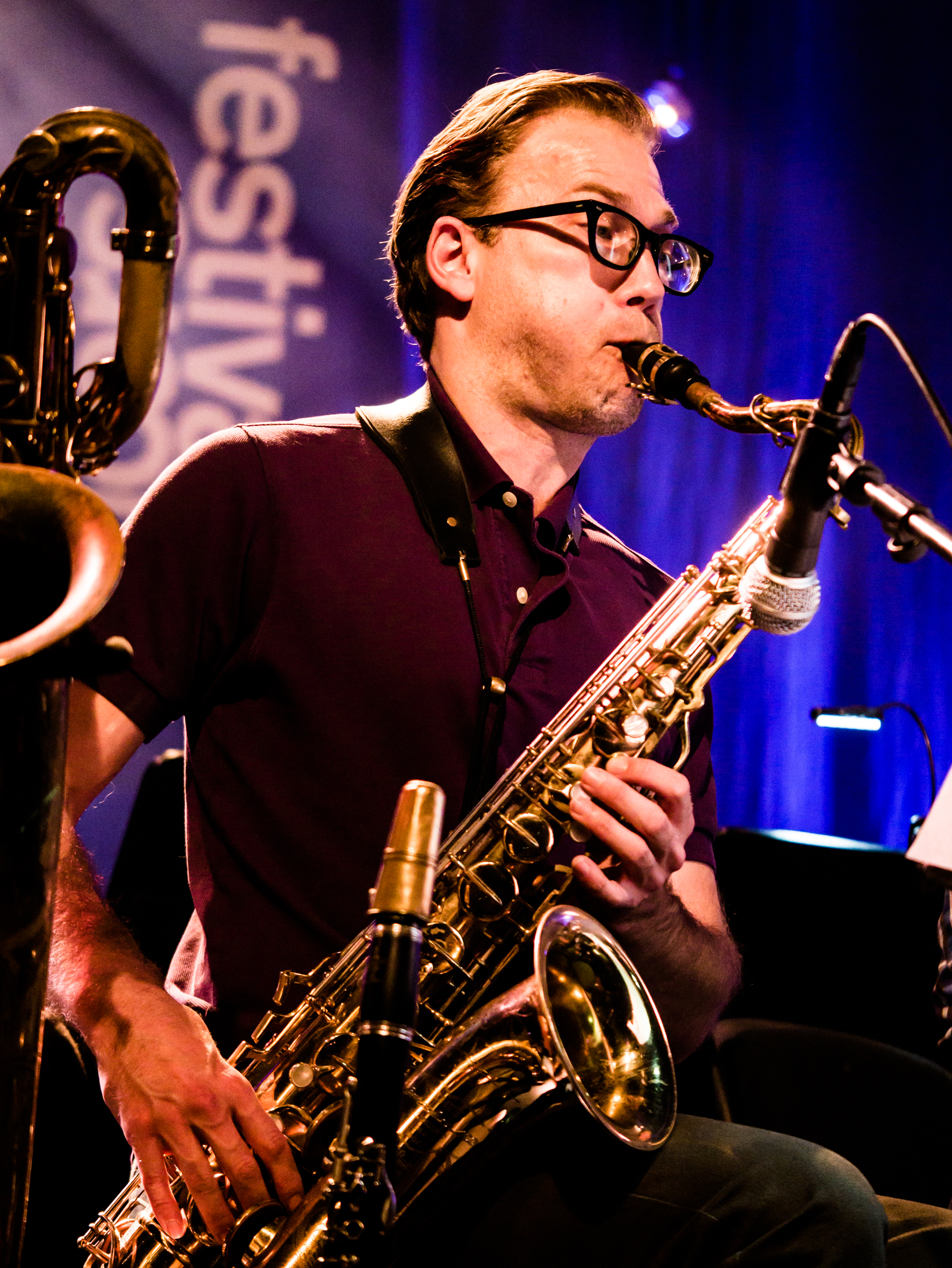
- Matt Bauder

Background information
- Born: 1976 (age 49–50); Ann Arbor, MI
- Genres: Jazz; doo-wop; electronic; rock; avant-garde
- Occupation: Musician
- Instruments: Saxophone; clarinet; bass clarinet; flute; guitar
- Years active: 1999–present
- Labels: Clean Feed Records; 482 Music; I and Ear Records; Porter Records
- Website: mattbauder.net

Matt Bauder (born 1976) is an American jazz saxophonist, clarinetist and composer. He is the bandleader of the jazz trio Hearing Things, the jazz quintet Day in Pictures, and the modern doo-wop group White Blue Yellow & Clouds. He is a member of the long-form improvisation trio Memorize the Sky, jazz collective Ghost Train Orchestra, and was formerly a member of the touring lineups for Arcade Fire and Iron & Wine.

== Early life and education ==
Bauder was born and raised in Ann Arbor, Michigan. He attended the University of North Texas in Denton, and earned a bachelor of fine arts in jazz and contemporary improvisation at the University of Michigan in Ann Arbor. He lived in Chicago from 1999 to 2001, where he was a part of the city's modern jazz and improvised music scene, and then attended graduate school at Wesleyan University in Middletown, Connecticut. There he studied under Anthony Braxton and received a master's degree in composition. He lived in Berlin for a year, and moved to New York City in 2005.

== Career ==
In 2003, Bauder released his debut album, Weary Already of the Way, on 482 Music. He followed that up in 2007 with the first album from his long-form improvisational jazz trio Memorize the Sky, featuring Bauder on saxophone, clarinet, bass clarinet and percussion, Zach Wallace on bass, vibraphone and percussion, and Aaron Siegel on drums and percussion. Bauder released two more albums with Memorize the Sky, in 2008 and 2010.

Bauder is the bandleader and plays saxophone and guitar in the jazz trio Hearing Things, with JP Schlegelmilch on organ and Vinnie Sperrazza on drums.

In 2001, Bauder formed the doo-wop jazz group White Blue Yellow & Clouds. He plays saxophone and guitar in the group, and also sings lead vocals on some of the songs. They released Introducing White Blue Yellow & Clouds in 2007. The album features trumpeter Peter Evans, bassist Jason Ajemian, Fred Thomas (of Saturday Looks Good to Me) and sound artist Dan St. Clair. On the album, the band mashes up '50s doo-wop, '60s soul and California pop music with avant-garde flourishes, and includes covers of "God Only Knows" by The Beach Boys, "Lovers Never Say Goodbye" by The Flamingos and "Hushabye" by The Mystics.

Bauder has released two albums with his Brooklyn-based jazz quintet Day in Pictures on Clean Feed Records, the 2010 self-titled debut and 2014's Nightshades, with trumpeter Nate Wooley, pianist Kris Davis, bassist Jason Ajemian and drummer Tomas Fujiwara. Bauder played tenor saxophone and composed the songs on both albums.

In 2014, he joined the Arcade Fire's touring lineup, remaining with the band until 2016. He played saxophone and clarinet on two tracks on Arcade Fire member Will Butler's 2015 debut album Policy. He has also toured with Iron & Wine, played in the Broadway production of Fela! and collaborated on numerous projects with performance artist Aki Sasamoto, including the 2012 installation Centripetal Run, for which Bauder played saxophone, drums and guitar, sometimes simultaneously. Bauder regularly performs with Harris Eisenstadt's quintet Canada Day, and has also appeared on recordings by the Exploding Star Orchestra, Taylor Ho Bynum, Anthony Braxton, Rob Mazurek and Harris Eisenstadt.

== Discography ==
=== Albums ===
Year	Title
2003	Weary Already of the Way: By: Matt Bauder; Released: October 28, 2003; Label: 482 Music; Formats: CD, digital download
2007	Memorize the Sky: By: Memorize the Sky; Released: May 8, 2007; Label: 482 Music; Formats: CD, digital download
2007	Introducing White Blue Yellow & Clouds: By: White Blue Yellow & Clouds; Released: November 6, 2007; Label: I and Ear Records; Formats: CD
2008	In Former Times: By: Memorize the Sky; Released: November 11, 2008; Label: Clean Feed Records; Formats: CD, digital download
2010	Paper Gardens: By: Matt Bauder; Released: May 18, 2010; Label: Porter Records; Formats: CD, digital download
2010	Day in Pictures: By: Matt Bauder and Day in Pictures; Released: November 8, 2010; Label: Clean Feed Records; Formats: CD, digital download
2010	Creeks: By: Memorize the Sky; Released: December 4, 2010; Label: Broken Research; Formats: LP, CD, digital download
2014	Nightshades: By: Matt Bauder and Day in Pictures; Released: January 21, 2014; Label: Clean Feed Records; Formats: CD, digital download

=== Extended plays ===
Year	Title
2003	Object 3: By: Matt Bauder; Released: August 19, 2003; Label: Locust; Formats: CD

=== Singles ===
Year	Title
2015	"Stalefish / Transit of Venus": By: Hearing Things; Released: March 1, 2015; Label: Hawks Records; Formats: 7-inch

=== Appears on ===
Year	Album	Artist	Credits
1999	Explosion: Cerebral	Explosion: Cerebral	Saxophone, composer
2000	Childish Delusions	Bill Brovoid	Saxophone
2001	Tramps, Traitors and Little Devils	Drag City Supersession	Strings, reeds
2001	H.O.M.E.S., Vol. 1	The Original Brothers and Sisters of Love	Clarinet, saxophone
2002	When Flowers Covered the Earth	Warren Defever	Saxophone
2002	The Big Bang	King Kong	Saxophone
2002	Last Night	His Name Is Alive	Saxophone
2003	The Howling Hex	Neil Michael Hagerty	Saxophone
2003	All Your Summer Songs	Saturday Looks Good to Me	Saxophone
2005	2 + 2 Compositions	Anthony Braxton	Clarinet, saxophone, composer
2006	Fugitive Pieces	Reuben Radding	Clarinet, saxophone
2006	Continuum	Reminder	Clarinet
2007	We Are All From Somewhere Else	Exploding Star Orchestra	Clarinet, saxophone
2007	The Middle Picture	Taylor Ho Bynum	Clarinet, saxophone
2008	Bill Dixon with Exploding Star Orchestra	Bill Dixon, Exploding Star Orchestra	Clarinet, saxophone
2008	Six Lines of Transformation; Music for Eight Bamboo Flutes	Andrew Raffo Dewar	Clarinet
2009	Running With the Wasters	The Takeover UK	Saxophone
2009	Luminosity	Matthew Welch	Clarinet
2009	Garabatos Volume One	Positive Catastrophe	Clarinet, saxophone
2009	Canada Day	Harris Eisenstadt	Saxophone
2009	Asphalt Flowers Forking Paths	Taylor Ho Bynum	Clarinet, saxophone
2010	Stars Have Shapes	Exploding Star Orchestra	Clarinet, saxophone
2010	Ashcan Rantings	Adam Lane's Full Throttle Orchestra	Saxophone
2011	The House of Friendly Ghosts, Vol. I	The Sway Machinery	Saxophone
2011	Hothouse Stomp	Ghost Train Orchestra	Saxophone
2011	Staring at the X	Forest Fire	Saxophone
2011	People Change	Nat Baldwin	Clarinet
Canada Day II	Harris Eisenstadt	Saxophone	
2012	Dibrujo, Dibrujo, Dibrujo…	Positive Catastrophe	Saxophone
2013	Dome Branches: The MVP Demos	Nat Baldwin	Clarinet
2013	True Hallucinations	Ex Cops	Saxophone
2013	B-Room	Dr. Dog	Saxophone
2014	Live in Ljubljana	Adam Lane's Full Throttle Orchestra	Saxophone
2015	The Gravity of Our Commitment	Never Enough Hope	Saxophone
2015	Policy	Will Butler	Clarinet, saxophone
2015	How You Look When You're Falling Down	Birthmark	Clarinet, saxophone
2015	Canada Day IV	Harris Eisenstadt	Saxophone
2016	Sorrow: A Reimagining of Gorecki's 3rd Symphony	Colin Stetson	Saxophone
2016	Life's a Real Dream	Lard Dog & The Band of Shy	Saxophone, vocals
2016	Matter Anti-Matter	Exploding Star Orchestra	Saxophone
2016	Enter the Plustet	Taylor Ho Bynum	Saxophone
2017	On Parade in Parede	Harris Eisenstadt	Saxophone
