= DJ Hazard (comedian) =

American actor, musician and comedian

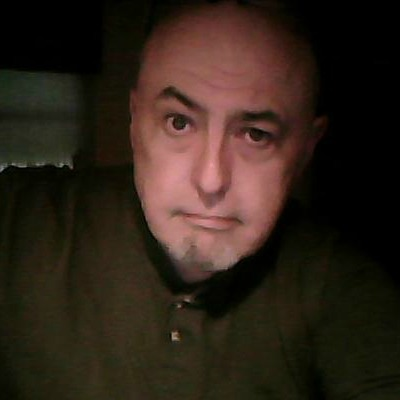
- New York City May 2, 2012
- Born: Dennis Joseph Hanard; 1953 (age 72–73)

DJ Hazard (born Dennis Joseph Hanard in 1953) is an American writer, actor, musician and standup comedian.

== Early life ==
Born in New York City, he grew up in the Bronx and Astoria, Queens and attended the High School of Art and Design, where he studied cartooning, animation, illustration and advertising. He graduated in 1971. His family moved to Boston the following year.

== Career ==
In 1979, he became one of the founders of The Ding Ho Comedy Club in Cambridge, Massachusetts, along with Barry Crimmins, Steven Wright, Paula Poundstone, Bobcat Goldthwait, Denis Leary and others. Throughout the 1980s, DJ Hazard was active in the Boston comedy scene, hosting shows at the Comedy Connection and Play It Again Sam's. He performed under the name DJ Hanard, but legally changed his name to DJ Hazard in 1984 after frequently seeing misspellings of his name. In the late 1980s, he hosted a show called "The Friday Night Comic Strip" on WZLX and in 1989, he was named Comedian of the Year in a Boston Herald reader's poll.

During this time, he was known for taking time to critique and encourage new comedians. In the interview section of the documentary film When Stand Up Stood Out, which explores the Boston comedy scene in the 1980s and 90s, Dane Cook cites DJ Hazard as being one of the comedians who inspired him to enter standup comedy. In a 2005 interview, Louis CK credited Hazard for being his mentor when he first started out.

After 14 years as a headliner in Boston comedy, Hazard moved to Los Angeles in the spring of 1994. He returned to Boston a year later, bought a 1985 Nissan Stanza and set off on a three-year self-booked tour of North America before returning to Boston in 1998. He moved back to New York City in 2006. He has also performed extensively throughout Canada, including Winnipeg, Toronto and Montreal.

In addition to his stand-up performances, DJ Hazard has released three comedy/music CDs: "Lock Up The Planet When You Leave" (1993), "El Hazardo Rides Again" (2007) and "Man Of Hazardium" (2009). He has also acted in several movies, beginning with the 2004 film Blackballed: The Bobby Dukes Story.

== Personal life ==
In 1982, he was included in Boston Herald columnist Norma Nathan's Book of Boston's Most Eligible Bachelors.

On June 30, 1991, he and fellow comedian and best friend Rick Jenkins were mistaken for two of America's Most Wanted and held by Federal Agents for the better part of the day until they proved their innocence.
