= Tiny Parham =

Canadian-American jazz bandleader and pianist (1900–1943)

Hartzell Strathdene "Tiny" Parham (February 25, 1900 – April 4, 1943) was a Canadian-born American jazz bandleader and pianist of African-American descent.

== Life and career ==
Parham was born in Winnipeg, Manitoba, Canada, but grew up in Kansas City, Missouri, United States. He worked as a pianist at The Eblon Theatre being mentored by the ragtime pianist and composer James Scott, and later touring with territory bands in the Southwestern United States, before moving to Chicago in 1926.

He is best remembered for the recordings he made in Chicago between 1927 and 1930 for the Victor Talking Machine Company, as an accompanist for Johnny Dodds and several female blues singers as well as with his own band. Most of the musicians Parham played with are not well known in their own right, though cornetist Punch Miller, banjoist Papa Charlie Jackson, saxophone player Junie Cobb and bassist Milt Hinton are exceptions.

Parham's Victor recordings are all highly collectible and appreciated as prime examples of late 1920s jazz. His style of jazz was comparable to the sophisticated style of Jelly Roll Morton. Parham favored the violin and a number of his records have surprisingly sophisticated violin solos, along with the typical upfront tuba, horns and reeds. Parham wrote most, if not all, of his own material.

In 1930, like Jelly Roll Morton, Henry "Red" Allen, and King Oliver, Victor chose not to renew Parham's contact. After 1930, Parham found work in theater houses, especially as an organist; his last recordings were made in 1940. His entire recorded output fits on two compact discs.

The cartoonist R. Crumb included a drawing of Parham in his classic 1982 collection of trading cards and later book Early Jazz Greats. Parham was the only non-American born so included. The book also includes a bonus CD which had a Parham track.

Parham died on April 4, 1943, in Milwaukee, Wisconsin. In 2019 the Killer Blues Headstone Project placed the headstone for Parham at Burr Oak Cemetery in Alsip, Illinois.

== Discography ==
- 1926-29 - Classics (Chronological #661, 1992)
- 1929-40 - & His Musicians_Classics (Chronological #691, 1993)
- 1928-30 - Tiny Parham (2xCD) (Timeless Historical, 1996)
