= Andy Laster =

American jazz musician

Andrew Jay Laster (born May 25, 1961, in Bethpage, New York) is an American jazz saxophonist and composer.

== Biography ==
Andrew Jay Laster was born on May 25, 1961 in Bethpage, New York. He grew up on Long Island. As a teenager he studied music with Joe Dixon and Dave Burns in the 1970s. He began his college education at the University of Michigan; studying there from 1979 to 1981 before transferring to the Cornish College of the Arts (CCA) in Seattle, Washington where he was a student in 1981-1982. He never graduated from either of these schools, but later in life earned college degrees after having worked professionally as a musician. At CCA he befriended fellow student, guitarist Brad Shepik, who later played with Laster's band Hyrda.

Laster began performing professionally while living in Seattle during the early 1980s. In 1985 he moved to New York City, and four years later he released his first jazz album, Hippo Stomp (1989, Sound Aspects Records). In 1989 he went on tour with Lyle Lovett in concerts promoting his newly released album Lyle Lovett and His Large Band. He toured and recorded intermittently with Lovett from 1989 to 1995, and in this same period played in Phil Haynes's 4 Horns & What? from 1989 to 1994 and in the band New and Used from 1990 to 1996.

In 1993 Laster toured Europe with jazz cellist Hank Roberts. He released two more albums on Sound Aspects Records, Twirler (1990) and Hydra (1994). The latter album was named after Laster's band Hyrdra whose other core members included trumpeter Herb Robertson, double-bassist Drew Gress, and drummer Tom Rainey. Brad Shepik would also occasionally join the group as guitarist. The band released a second album, Polyogue (1995), on the Songlines record label.

From 1994 to 1998 Laster toured and recorded with the band Orange Then Blue, and he also performed and recorded with bands led by Bobby Previte, Julius Hemphill, Marty Ehrlich, and Erik Friedlander in this same window of time. A second band he established, Interpretations of Lessness, released an eponymonous album in 1997 on the Songlines lable. Other member in this group included Cuong Vu, Erik Friedlander, and Kenny Wolleson. In 1997-1998 he performed in Mark Helias's band Attack the Future. Another band he established released the album Soft Shell (2000, Knitting Factory).

Laster earned a B.A. in Music from State University of New York, Empire State University in 1997 and a M.A. in music composition from Queens College, City University of New York in 1999. In his later career he has been active as a composer of both jazz and modern classical music. This latter form of music was featured on the album Riptide (2011, Tzadik) in which he died perform but was only a composer.

== Discography ==
- Hippo Stomp (Sound Aspects, 1989)
- Twirler (Sound Aspects, 1990)
- Hydra (Sound Aspects, 1994)
- Polyogue (Songlines, 1995)
- Interpretations of Lessness (Songlines, 1997)
- Soft Shell (Knitting Factory, 2000)
- Window Silver Bright (New World, 2002)
- Riptide (Tzadik, 2011)
