= Mary Ann Bevan =

Side show performer, nurse

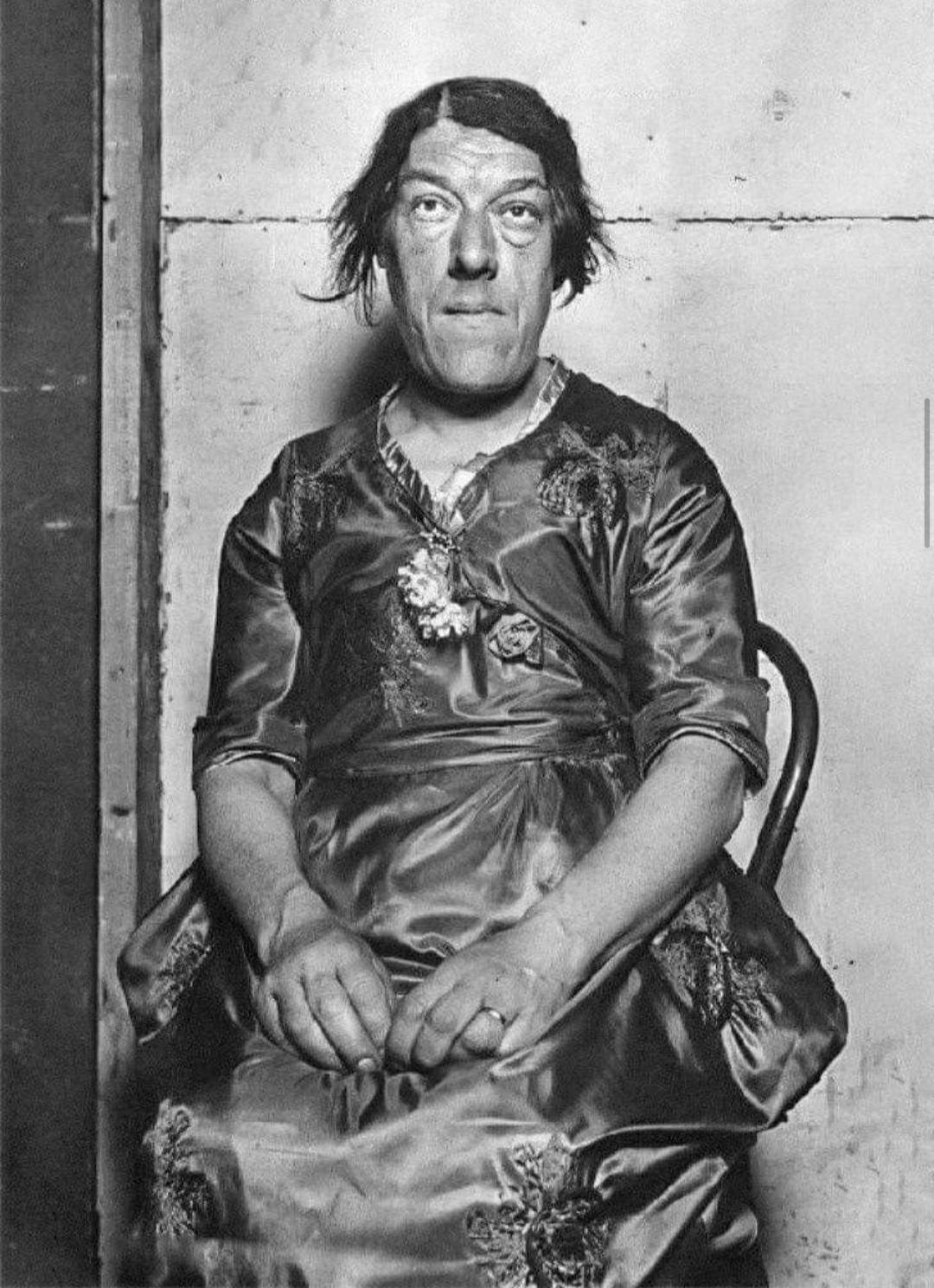
- Bevan, c. early 20th century
- Born: Mary Ann Webster; 20 December 1874; Plaistow, Newham, London, England
- Died: 26 December 1933 (aged 59)
- Occupation: Sideshow performer ∙ nurse
- Employers: Employed by Samuel W. Gumpertz to perform at Coney Island Dreamland; Ringling Brothers Circus and was employed as a nurse.
- Spouse: Thomas Bevan (m. 1902; died 1914)
- Children: 4

Mary Ann Bevan (née Webster; 20 December 1874 – 26 December 1933) was an English nurse and sideshow performer. After developing acromegaly, she became internationally known in the 1920s and 1930s for being exhibited as "the ugliest woman in the world" in American sideshows.

Born into a working-class family in Plaistow, East London, Bevan worked as a nurse before marrying Thomas Bevan in 1902. Following the onset of acromegaly and her husband's death in 1914, she entered and won an "Ugliest Woman" contest in order to support her four children. In 1920, she was recruited by American showman Samuel W. Gumpertz to perform at Dreamland at Coney Island, later appearing with the Ringling Brothers Circus while also working as a nurse.

== Early life ==
Mary Ann Webster was born on 20 December 1874 in Plaistow, East London, the eighth of eight children born into a working-class family. At the age of 22, Webster became a nurse.

In 1902, at the age of 27, Webster married Thomas Bevan. The couple had four children together. Around 1906, about four years after her marriage and at approximately 32 years of age, she began to develop troubling symptoms. These included abnormal growth, changes to her facial features, severe headaches, and gradually worsening eyesight, attributed to acromegaly.

Eight years later, in 1914, Bevan's husband died suddenly and she was left to support their four children alone. Unable to support her family on her nursing income, she entered an "Ugliest Woman" contest, which she won. The victory led to a career as a sideshow performer, allowing her to provide for her children.

== Career ==
In 1920, at about 45 years of age, Bevan was hired by American showman Samuel W. Gumpertz to appear in the sideshow at Dreamland, an amusement park at Coney Island in New York City. After winning the "Ugliest Woman" contest, she travelled to the United States to earn a living for her family. She spent much of the remainder of her life performing at Dreamland.

In 1926, when Bevan was about 51 years old, the British newspaper Leeds Mercury described her as a pleasant woman who hated being pitied and was enjoyable to talk to. The newspaper also reported that she wore size 12 shoes.

Later in her career, Bevan appeared with the Ringling Brothers Circus, where she was employed as both a sideshow performer and a nurse. She continued working on the American circus and sideshow circuit until her death in 1933.

== Death ==
By the early 1930s, Bevan had spent more than a decade performing in American sideshows. She continued to appear with the Ringling Brothers Circus until her death on 26 December 1933, aged 59.

In accordance with her final wish, Bevan was buried in Brockley and Ladywell Cemeteries in London.

== Legacy ==
In the early 2000s, Bevan's image was used by Hallmark Cards on a birthday card in the United Kingdom.

The card made reference to the television dating show Blind Date. Subsequently, a complaint was made by Dutch physician Wouter de Herder that it was disrespectful to a woman who had become deformed as the result of a disease. Hallmark agreed that it was inappropriate and stopped the distribution of the card.
