= Joseph Giacomo Ferari =

American circus proprietor (1868–1953)

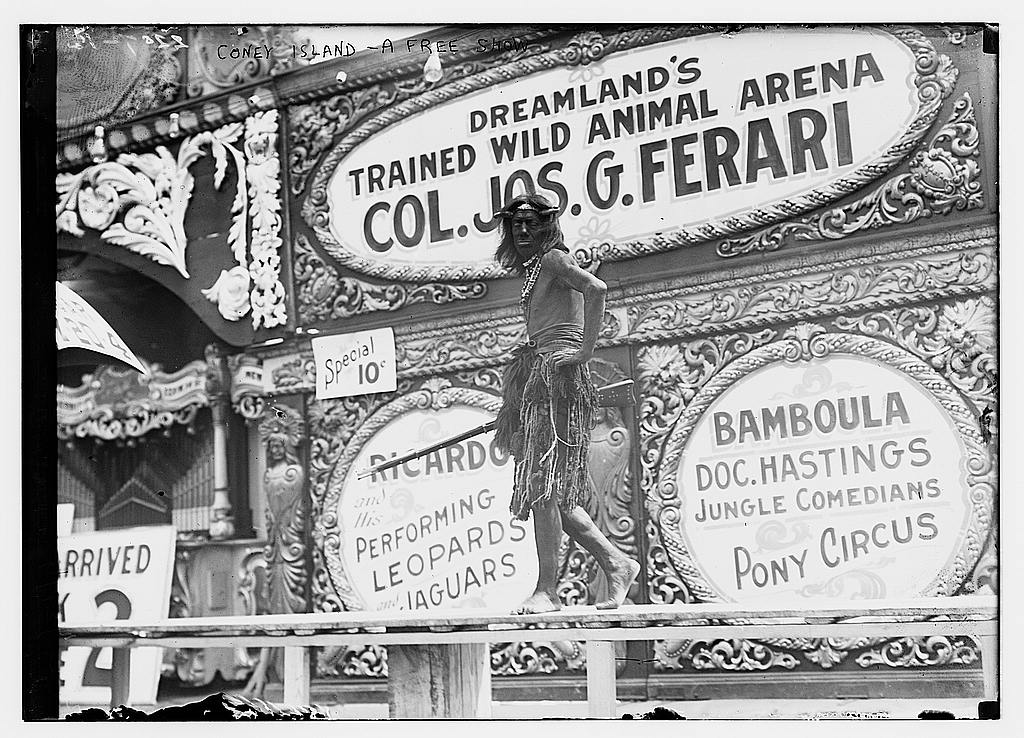
Joseph G. Ferari's exhibit at Dreamland's Trained Wild Animal Arena in 1911

Joseph Giacomo Ferari (January 4, 1868 - May 11, 1953) was a lion tamer and circus owner at Dreamland on Coney Island.

== Biography ==
He was born on January 4, or January 14, 1868, in Leeds, England. He had a brother, Francis Ferari (1862–1914), also a lion tamer. Joseph died on May 11, 1953, in Port Richmond, New York, on Staten Island.
