= Jack Bonavita =

American lion tamer (1866-1917)

- Born: 1866; Philadelphia
- Died: 19 March 1917
- Occupations: Lion tamer, actor

John Fredrich Gentner (1866 – 19 March 1917), better known by his artistic name Jack Bonavita or Captain Jack Bonavita, was an American lion tamer, actor and director.

== Life ==
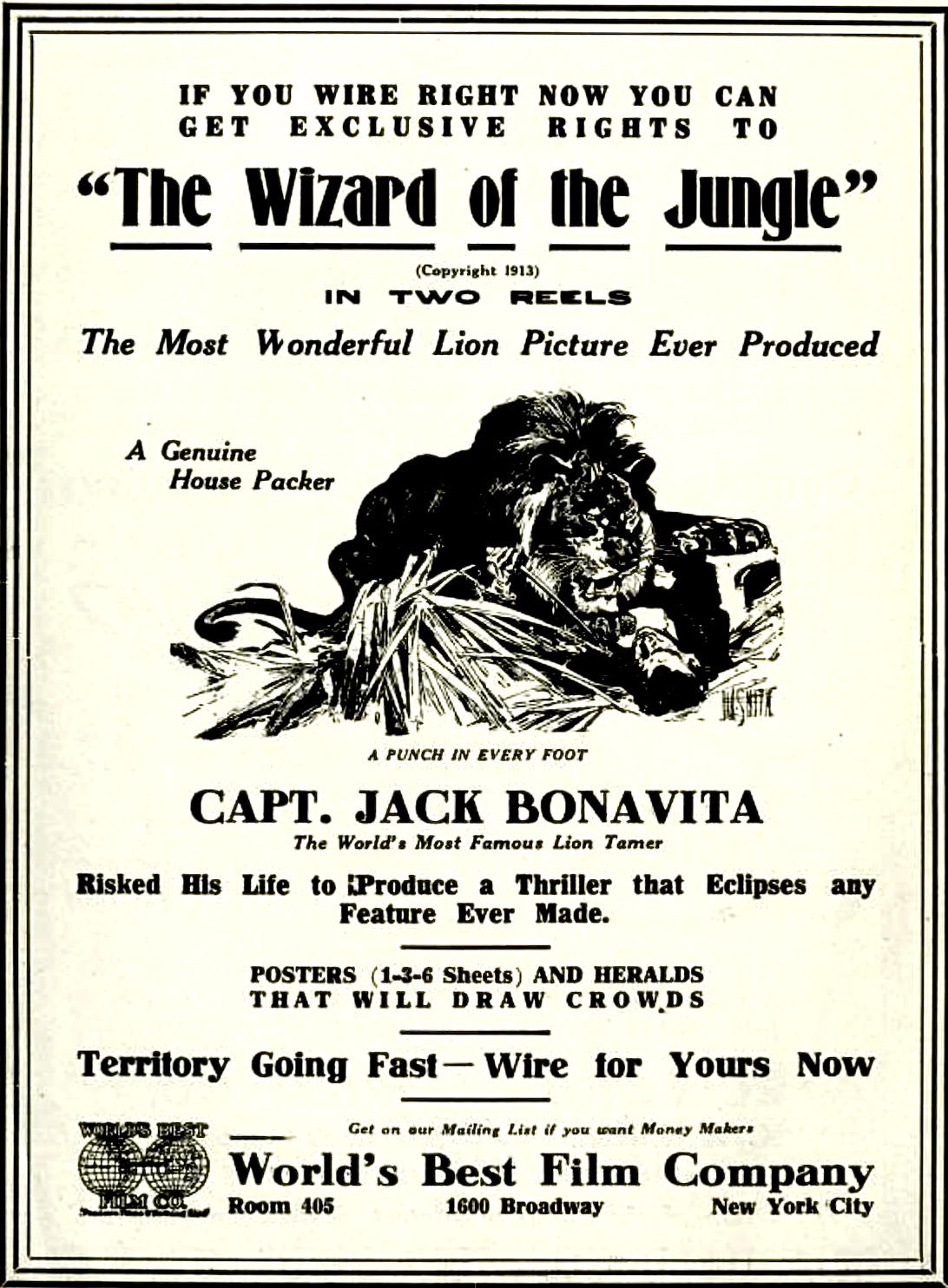
Advertisement for 1913 film The Wizard of the Jungle directed by Harold M. Shaw and starring Captain Jack Bonavita.

Bonavita was born in Philadelphia in 1866, where he did his studies. He started his career as a circus acrobat for P.T. Barnum, to later join the O'Brien Shows and become an animal trainer. He travelled the world with the Frank C. Bostock Animal Shows.

In 1904 he lost an arm due to an attack by a lion called Baltimore, at the Bostock arena at Dreamland, Coney Island. The arm had to be amputated due to blood infection.

Bonavita continued working at Dreamland until 27 May 1911, when the Hell's Gate ride caught fire and burnt the amusement park.

After the incident Bonavita focused his career in Hollywood, and worked in several films, as a trainer, actor an director. Some of them are The Rajah's Sacrifice, The Bogy Man, The Vindication, When Avarice Rules, Stanley in Africa, and The Lion, the Woman, and the Man.

Bonavita died in Los Angeles on March 19, 1917, as a result of an attack by a polar bear during a performance. The polar bear, named Piccolo due to its small size, was shot by a police officer who rushed to the scene. Bonavita was taken to a hospital but died shortly after. The polar bear skeleton is exhibited at the research collection of the Natural History Museum of Los Angeles County.

== Filmography ==
Bonavita worked in several films, often showing his skills as a lion tamer:

- The Island of Lions (1913)
- Love's Justice (1913)
- The Wizard of the Jungle (1913)
- The Diamond Smugglers (1914)
- The Rajah's Sacrifice (1915)
- The Lion, the Woman, and the Man (1915)
- The Winning of Jess (1915)
- When Avarice Rules (1915)
- The Avenger of Lions
- The Bogy Man
- The Vindication (1915)
- Stanley in Africa
- The Heart of Tara (1916)
- The Hidden Law (1916)
- The Bait (1916)
- The Soul's Cycle (1916)
