= Philomena Marano =

American artist

- Born: Brooklyn, New York
- Education: High School of Art and Design; Pratt Institute
- Known for: Papier collé, Coney Island art
- Website: philomenamarano.com

Philomena Marano is an American artist specializing in papier collé.

== Early life and education ==
Marano was born and raised in Brooklyn, New York, growing up in the borough's Bensonhurst neighborhood. During her childhood, the family made frequent summer trips to the amusement parks and beaches of nearby Coney Island, which would have a later effect on her art. She graduated from New York's High School of Art and Design, and earned a Bachelor of Fine Arts degree in 1974 from the Pratt Institute.

== Career ==
=== Coney Island ===
From 1975 to 1977, Marano worked as a studio assistant to the American Pop artist Robert Indiana, who had been commissioned by the Santa Fe Opera to create set and costume designs for their Bicentennial production of Gertrude Stein’s opera "The Mother of Us All." As part of Indiana's design team for the project, Marano was introduced to papier collé, a process of cutting paper into defined shapes and adhering them to a flat surface. This method was used to create maquettes for Indiana's set and costume designs for the Santa Fe Opera's production. Marano's introduction to the papier collé method, her exposure to Indiana's use of bright color "in his paintings of words and numbers in which he infused his own autobiographical messages," plus Indiana's interest in popular culture and the culture of Coney Island, proved influential to Marano's later work. This reintroduction of Coney Island into Marano's thinking led to her renewed interest in the neighborhood.

By the late 1970s, Marano was concentrating on Coney Island imagery almost exclusively. The earliest image in the series was "Shooting Gallery #2", created in papier collé in 1977. Marano was also becoming involved in Coney Island's revival of cultural activities, and in 1981 she participated in an outdoor art show on West 10th Street, adjacent to the Cyclone Rollercoaster, exhibiting an eleven-foot construction of the Parachute Jump, called "Flowers From an Unkept Garden." Through this exhibition, Marano met artist Richard Eagan, with whom she co-founded the Coney Island Hysterical Society in 1982, whose roster of artists and Coney Island supporters grew to 400 members. In 1983, Marano and Eagan collaborated on a 2200 square foot painted mural called "Steeplechase Come Back," an homage to Steeplechase Park, which had been demolished in 1966.

Additional collaborations with Eagan continued, including an elaborate project organizing the restoration the defunct "Dragon’s Cave" ride. Marano served as Art Director, and together with ten other artists restored and repainted the cars and interior scenes, renaming the ride the Spookhouse. The project was further enhanced by donations from Harvey Fierstein of sets and props designed by Bill Stabile for Fierstein's then-closed off-Broadway production, "Spookhouse."

Though Marano worked in various media, including linoleum cut, paint, serigraph, and drawing, papier collé became her primary process, and her imagery remained focused on Coney Island. Creating images of the amusement parks’ rides such as the Zipper, the Wonder Wheel entrance depicted in "Thrills," and others, led Marano to treat her imagery as a comprehensive expression of Coney Island's historic and cultural significance, particularly in light of the amusement parks’ decay and their threatened demise. A 1987 papier collé work titled "Lionel’s Chair" expressed this idea in its depiction of the original Thunderbolt (1925 roller coaster) ride, with the Parachute Jump in the background and in the foreground the empty chair of the Thunderbolt's deceased night watchman, Lionel Butler, who "with the help of two dogs and a shotgun, guarded the ride in its last days."

In 1990, Marano titled the Coney Island series "American Dream-Land," a name referencing the common ethos of the American Dream and Coney Island's Dreamland amusement park, which burned to the ground in 1911. "American Dream-Land" became an ongoing project depicting the neighborhood's amusement park rides, sideshows, game stalls, food purveyors, and other activities and businesses in the area. In 2007, sponsored by the Coney Island History Project as part of the "American Dream-Land" series, Marano created an installation called "Giant Lolly", honoring Phillips Candy shop, which had operated at the arcade entrance of the Stillwell Avenue subway station from 1930 until its closure in 2000, when renovation began at the subway station. The installation, a 78-inch tall wood and cut paper construction of a giant lollypop, was on view for a year, 2007-2008, in the area of the original Phillip's Candy shop at the arcade entrance to the renovated station.

In 2008, Marano collaborated again with Richard Eagan to construct "25 Shoot," a 52-inch tall wood, paint and dimensional serigraph structure of a shooting gallery stall. "25 Shoot" was exhibited in 2011 at the "Topsy Turvy: Artists and the Amusement Utopia" exhibition at the 60 Wall Street Gallery in New York.

Later American Dream-Land papier collé images include "Miracles Only" from 2010, depicting cloud angels over Coney Island signage, rides and skyline, "I Wonder As I Wander," from 2011, depicting directional signage to the Wonder Wheel in the night sky, and "Ma Est Ide" from 2012, depicting the entrance and partial signage for the "Spookarama World’s Longest Spook Ride."

=== Signage ===
In addition to imagery of Coney Island's rides and businesses, Marano also created papier collé works based on the area's signage, particularly the style and visual impact of Coney Island's signage. Though American Dream-Land's imagery included signage such as entry signs, names of rides, game-stall and food-stall signs, these signs were included as part of the overall landscape. In 2014, Marano created a specific signage series in papier collé and painted canvas. Many of the signs were generic, such as "Ride," which was framed in salvaged boards from the Coney Island Boardwalk, and "Thrills," among others.

=== Other projects ===
Marano's Coney Island interests included the variety of tastes and colors offered by the area's candy purveyors. Her series "Sugar Rush" depicts the numerous sweets associated with Coney Island: ice cream cones, all-day suckers, sodas, candy bars, candy apples, gum drops, etc.

Her "Urbanology" series expands her Coney Island and signage imagery to include out-of-the-way views of urban streets and the small businesses there. Images include the "Flat Fix" series, papier collé depictions of various tire shops.

In 2011, Marano, in collaboration with The Studio animation studio, and composer Carol Lipnik, produced "Take Me There," a short animation created in papier collé imagery. The narrative, inspired by the Franklin Avenue shuttle, an elevated Brooklyn line of the New York City subway system, derives from memories of Marano's childhood riding the subway to Coney Island, and envisioning the elevated train ride turning into a roller coaster. Marano's imagery was originally intended as 29 glass panels for an unrealized 1999 commission from the Metropolitan Transit Authority.

From 1981 to 1984, Marano was lead artist for broadcast graphics for the NBC TV network's "Ask NBC News," a national news program for children.

In 2004, her artwork was seen in the 2004 film, "The Terminal," directed by Steven Spielberg.

In 1994, Marano wrote and illustrated the children's book, "Word Sandwiches."

=== Exhibitions, public commissions and collections ===
Marano's work has been exhibited in several museums and galleries in New York, including the Tabla Rasa Gallery, The Prince Street Gallery, Smart Clothes Gallery, ACA Galleries, A. M. Richards Fine Art, and others.

In 2004, Marano produced the winning entry in the inaugural "Spirit of Brooklyn" competition, creating a poster depicting various Brooklyn landmarks, including the Brooklyn Bridge and Coney Island's Parachute Jump. The poster was published on conjunction with the opening of the Brooklyn Tourism Center.

Marano's work is represented in various private and public collections, including the Brooklyn Museum.
