= Samuel W. Gumpertz =

American showman (1868–1952)

- Born: 1868; Washington, United States
- Died: June 22, 1952 (aged 84); Sarasota, Florida, United States
- Occupation: Entertainment industry talent promotor
- Known for: Building Coney Island Dreamland

Samuel W. Gumpertz (1868 – June 22, 1952) was an American showman who played a part in the building of Coney Island's Dreamland.

Gumpertz was the talent manager of Harry Houdini and became the right-hand man to John T. Ringling, last of the famed Ringling Brothers. After Ringling retired in 1932, Gumpertz took over the circus in the capacity of vice-president and general manager. He was responsible for merging Ringling Brothers with Barnum and Bailey, Hagenbeck-Wallace Circus, and the Al G. Barnes Circus

== Biography and career ==
Gumpertz was born in 1868, to Herman and Elizabeth Gumpertz, his father was a lawyer and Civil War veteran. Samuel started his career as a professional acrobat aged nine, with the Montgomery and Queen Circus. After running away to join the circus, he took part in every phrase of the industry, as an actor, producer and rough rider at Buffalo Bill's wild west shows. His career as an acrobat was short lived, and Gumpertz resumed his schooling. However, after his family relocated to San Francisco three years later, Gumpertz worked as a child actor at the Tivoli Opera House. As an agent, he traveled the world in search of indigenous people to perform in the popular ethnographic sideshows of the day, including Filipinos who were exhibited in an "Igorot Village", long-necked women from Burma and people from Borneo who performed as "wild men of Borneo," whom Gumpertz reportedly "acquired" by paying two hundred bags of salt to tribal leaders. Many contemporary observers criticized Gumpertz for the explorative nature of his sideshows, but the reality is that these performers were making a good living that would have been impossible doing any other type of work at the time. Gumpertz owned Parkway Baths (the largest bathhouse on Coney Island), the Eden Musee Wax Museum, and the Chamber of Horrors. Gumpertz ran Dreamland until it burned down in 1911. Afterwards he served as the president of the Coney Island Chamber of Commerce. Then in 1929 he become the manager of the Ringling Brothers and Barnum & Bailey Circus.

== Personal life ==
Gumpertz was married to Evie Stetson in 1922, who was a member of Webber and Fields Troupe. After her death, he remarried Edith L. Green, his secretary of 22 years. After she died, he married a third time, to Beatrice Frances Wood of Methuen, Massachusetts. Gumpertz was Jewish by religion.
