= For the People (Dropkick Murphys album) =

Studio album by Dropkick Murphys
- Released: July 4, 2025
- Recorded: 2024–2025
- Studios: Q Division (Cambridge); Tonherd OG (Vienna)
- Genre: Celtic punk
- Length: 43:22
- Label: Dummy Luck
- Producer: Ted Hutt

Dropkick Murphys chronology
Okemah Rising (2023)	For the People (2025)	New England Forever (2026)

Singles from For The People
- 1. "Sirens" Released: September 19, 2024; 2. "Who'll Stand With Us?" Released: June 3, 2025; 3. "Chesterfields and Aftershave" Released: September 7, 2025; 4. "A Hero Among Many" Released: November 7, 2025; 5. "The Big Man" Released: January 12, 2026; 6. "Dropped on My Head" Released: July 10, 2026

For the People is the thirteenth studio album by American Celtic punk band Dropkick Murphys and was released on July 4, 2025 (streaming), and was released on October 10, 2025 (CD and LP), on Dummy Luck Records. The CD and LP versions of the album feature five bonus tracks that did not appear on the streaming version including the single "Sirens", which was released in September 2024.

The album marks the return of longtime singer Al Barr, who appears on just one song. Barr last appeared on the band's 2021 album, Turn Up That Dial; however, he was absent from the band's two albums that followed. In 2022, Barr announced his hiatus from the band to take care of his ailing mother. Billy Bragg, The Scratch and The Mary Wallopers also make guest appearances.

== Background ==
"We've always had the same message and haven't been afraid to speak out about what's important to us. But for me now, I think about my kids' future, and the next generation. That could be anything from speaking out against injustices, or just simply making sure you take the time to tell the people close to you how important they are to you", lead singer Ken Casey said about the album's themes. "One Last Goodbye 'Tribute to Shane'", which features The Scratch, is a tribute to the Pogues singer Shane MacGowan who died on 30 November, 2023. The lyrics in the song include the line "‘Piss off, you wanker,’ you signed on my soul". Casey said that is how MacGowan signed his copy of the "Dark Streets of London". Al Barr makes his long awaited return on the song "The Vultures Circle High". "Al is still taking time off for family but he's still part of our family, so we thought it would be nice to have his voice on this record", Casey said.

Billy Bragg appears on a cover of the Ewan MacColl song "School Days Over", a favorite of Bragg's. "Billy’s become a great friend. It’s inspiring how he’s carried on the protest singer legacy. He really walks the walk." Casey said. "Chesterfields and Aftershave" was written about Casey's grandfather while "Streetlights" is about Casey's father who died when he was 8 years old. "I never thought that I would write a song about the day my dad died but sometimes, like a lot of our songs, suddenly the right words or the right way to say it will pop into my head. And it’s like, ‘OK, well, now it’s time to tell that story." "The Big Man" was written as an ode to Pennywise guitarist Fletcher Dragge. "Many of these songs are about the issues that do harm to regular people. "For the People" is about… life. But life can be cruel, and I don’t want to side with the people that vote for cruelty, that vote against free school lunches for kids, and vote against workers' rights, and enable corporate greed in the growing wealth divide. So if the point is to have a heart and help people, where do those characteristics exist with those that side with the billionaires and the corporations over the worker and the child," Casey said.

== Promotion ==
The album was preceded by the singles and music videos for "Sirens" (which only appears on the CD and LP versions) on September 19, 2024, and "Who'll Stand With Us?" on June 3, 2025. The band will promote the album with a 2025 summer tour with Bad Religion. On July 12, 2025, the band performed a two hour free show in Quincy, MA (which was also held to celebrate the 400th anniversary of Quincy) to promote the release of the album. The media director of the city and the band's spokesperson said around 10,000 fans turned out for the show.The album's third single, "Chesterfields and Aftershave", which is about Casey's memories of his grandfather, was released on September 7, 2025, Grandparent's Day. The group released the album's fourth single, "A Hero Among Many", on November 7, 2025. The song is about Welles Crowther, a 24-year-old Boston College alumni and volunteer firefighter who worked at the World Trade Center on September 11, 2001. Welles is attributed with saving the lives of at least 18 people after United Flight 175 struck the 78th Floor of the WTC’s South Tower.The album's fifth single and music video for "The Big Man", was released on January 12, 2026.The album's fifth single, "Dropped on My Head", was released as a single and music video on July 10, 2026. The song was included as a bonus track on the album and is featured as the official theme song for the MGM+ series The Westies.

== Track listing ==
All tracks are written by Dropkick Murphys, except "School Days Over" (written by Ewan MacColl).

For the People track listing
No.	Title	Length
1.	"Who'll Stand with Us?"	3:51
2.	"Longshot" (featuring the Scratch)	3:27
3.	"The Big Man"	2:53
4.	"Chesterfields and Aftershave"	4:30
5.	"Bury the Bones" (featuring the Mary Wallopers)	3:27
6.	"Kids Games"	3:01
7.	"Sooner Kill 'Em First"	3:16
8.	"Fiending for the Lies"	2:42
9.	"Streetlights"	4:12
10.	"School Days Over" (featuring Billy Bragg)	3:28
11.	"The Vultures Circle High" (featuring Al Barr)	4:22
12.	"One Last Goodbye 'Tribute to Shane'" (featuring the Scratch)	4:13
Total length:		43:22

Expanded edition bonus tracks
No.	Title	Length
13.	"Dropped on My Head"	2:55
14.	"Take Your Bow"	3:45
15.	"Straight Edge (I Liked You Better)"	3:58
16.	"A Hero Among Many"	2:58
17.	"Sirens"	3:43
Total length:		60:41

=== Note ===
- "School Days Over" is a cover of the Ewan MacColl song "Schoolday's End"
- "One Last Goodbye" contains elements of the Irish traditional lament "Mo Ghile Mear"

== Personnel ==
Credits adapted from the album's liner notes.

=== Dropkick Murphys ===
- Campbell Webster – bagpipes, uilleann pipes
- James Lynch – guitar
- Matt Kelly – drums, percussion
- Ken Casey – lead vocals
- Tim Brennan – guitar, tin whistle, accordion, piano
- Jeff DaRosa – guitar, banjo, mandolin
- Kevin Rheault – bass

=== Additional musicians ===
- Al Barr – vocals on "The Vultures Circle High"
- The Scratch – vocals on "Longshot" and "One Last Goodbye"
- Andrew Hendy – banjo and vocals on "Bury the Bones"
- Charles Hendy – vocals on "Bury the Bones"
- Jesse Ahern – additional vocals
- Ben Barker – additional vocals
- Jakien Blueins – additional vocals
- Colin Campbell – additional vocals
- Kelley Costello – additional vocals
- Michelle DaRosa – additional vocals
- Bryan Harris – additional vocals
- Bryan Hinkley – additional vocals
- Nathan Rice – additional vocals
- Dave Stauble – additional vocals
- Pauline Wells – additional vocals

=== Technical and visuals ===
- Ted Hutt – production, mixing
- Ryan Mall – engineering, mixing
- Chuck Hargreaves – engineering
- Michael Healey – engineering
- Sean Cahalin – engineering
- Izaak Biewald – engineering
- Dave Cooley – mastering
- Studio Number One – album packaging design
- Jason Lowery – credits and lyrics layout, vinyl etching design
- Riley Vecchione – photography

== Charts ==
Chart performance for For the People
Chart (2025)	Peak position
Australian Albums (ARIA)	89
Austrian Albums (Ö3 Austria)	29
French Physical Albums (SNEP)	40
French Rock & Metal Albums (SNEP)	14
German Albums (Offizielle Top 100)	14
German Rock & Metal Albums (Offizielle Top 100)	4
Norwegian Physical Albums (IFPI Norge)	5
Scottish Albums (Official Charts)	37
Swedish Physical Albums (Sverigetopplistan)	18
Swiss Albums (Schweizer Hitparade)	33
UK Albums Sales (OCC)	45
UK Independent Albums (Official Charts)	18
UK Rock & Metal Albums (Official Charts)	5
US Top Album Sales (Billboard)	42
