= Turn Up That Dial =

Studio album by Dropkick Murphys
- Released: April 30, 2021
- Recorded: 2020
- Genre: Celtic punk; folk punk
- Length: 39:06
- Label: Born & Bred
- Producer: Ted Hutt

Dropkick Murphys chronology
| 11 Short Stories of Pain & Glory (2017) | Turn Up That Dial (2021) | This Machine Still Kills Fascists (2022) |

Singles from Turn Up That Dial
- 1. "Smash Shit Up" Released: January 31, 2020; 2. "Mick Jones Nicked My Pudding" Released: March 21, 2020; 3. "I Wish You Were Here" Released: November 24, 2020; 4. "Middle Finger" Released: February 23, 2021; 5. "Queen of Suffolk County" Released: March 31, 2021; 6. "L-EE-B-O-Y" Released: May 26, 2021; 7. "H.B.D.M.F." Released: August 6, 2021; 8. "Good as Gold" Released: December 8, 2021; 9. "We Shall Overcome" Released: March 15, 2022

Turn Up That Dial is the tenth studio album by American band Dropkick Murphys and was released on April 30, 2021, on the band's Born & Bred Records label. It is the band's first studio album in four years since 2017's 11 Short Stories of Pain & Glory.

== Background ==
Co-lead vocalist Ken Casey explained the album by saying, "On this record, the overall theme is the importance of music, and the bands that made us who we are. We just hope [the album] takes people's minds off their troubles. We're so fortunate and grateful to be in the position to share a little happiness in our own way. Our gratitude levels are off the chart. [...] If there's a message to this album, it's, 'Put your fist up and play it loud.' We've all done plenty of lamenting, so the main goal was to keep this fun. The darker the times got, the harder we fought to uplift with this music."

Casey said that the previous album, 11 Short Stories of Pain & Glory "came from a darker place and with the new album we wanted to bounce back. Inspiration automatically kicked us in the opposite direction. When the COVID-19 pandemic hit and things were so down, more than ever, we thought, nobody wants to hear an album about how bad 2020 was in 2021. For the most part, it's onward and upward and let's get out of this thing and have some anthems." "Chosen Few" addresses former President Trump's response to the pandemic while "I Wish You Were Here" is a ballad about the death of Al Barr's father. "I could write 37 (expletive) albums about how much I hate (Trump), but he dominated the news for four years, he wasn't going to dominate our record," Casey said. "And the song about Al's dad, well, it's an 11-song album and we thought, 'Here are the 10 songs to put a smile on your face. ... Then we stop and take a moment to acknowledge Al's dad and acknowledge 500,000 plus people lost."

== Promotion ==
The album was preceded by the singles and music videos for "Smash Shit Up", "Mick Jones Nicked My Pudding", "I Wish You Were Here", "Middle Finger" and "Queen of Suffolk County". Music videos were released for the singles "L-EE-B-O-Y" on May 26, 2021, for "H.B.D.M.F." on August 6, 2021, "Good as Gold" on December 8, 2021 and "We Shall Overcome", a bonus track on the expanded edition of the album, on March 15, 2022.

On May 1, 2021, the band held a record release party livestream where they performed the album in its entirety along with other songs from previous albums. The band also announced that they would tour in support of Turn Up That Dial beginning with a European tour from January to February 2022 with dates in North America expected to follow.

In February 2022 it was announced that Al Barr was forced to drop off of the band's 2022 St. Patrick’s Day Tour and their 2022 summer tour in Europe promoting the album to take care of his ailing mother who is battling Lewy Body Dementia. Jesse Ahern, Mikey Rivkees of The Rumjacks, and Jen Razavi of The Bombpops will be assisting on vocals for certain songs in place of Barr with Ken Casey taking over other vocal duties for Barr.

== Expanded edition ==
The band announced on March 10, 2022, that they would be releasing an expanded edition of Turn Up That Dial on March 18, 2022. The expanded edition will be a digital-only release and available in stereo and 3-dimensional Dolby Atmos mixes. It will contain the bonus tracks "The Bonny" (by Gerry Cinnamon) and "James Connolly", which were previously released as B-sides, along with their cover of the Civil Rights movement protest song "We Shall Overcome", which was released as a single and music video on March 15, 2022.

== Track listing ==
Turn Up That Dial track listing
| No. | Title | Length |
|---|---|---|
| 1. | "Turn Up That Dial" | 3:42 |
| 2. | "L-EE-B-O-Y" | 3:23 |
| 3. | "Middle Finger" | 2:35 |
| 4. | "Queen of Suffolk County" | 3:51 |
| 5. | "Mick Jones Nicked My Pudding" | 2:40 |
| 6. | "H.B.D.M.F." | 4:07 |
| 7. | "Good as Gold" | 3:20 |
| 8. | "Smash Shit Up" | 3:49 |
| 9. | "Chosen Few" | 3:31 |
| 10. | "City by the Sea" | 3:47 |
| 11. | "I Wish You Were Here" | 4:21 |
| Total length: | | 39:06 |

Japanese edition bonus tracks
| No. | Title | Length |
|---|---|---|
| 12. | "Middle Finger" (Live on Saint Patrick's Day 2020) | 2:50 |
| 13. | "Smash Shit Up" (Live on Saint Patrick's Day 2020) | 3:51 |
| Total length: | | 45:52 |

Digital only expanded edition bonus tracks
| No. | Title | Length |
|---|---|---|
| 12. | "The Bonny" | 3:13 |
| 13. | "James Connolly" (Black '47 cover) | 3:58 |
| 14. | "We Shall Overcome" | 3:36 |

== Personnel ==
Dropkick Murphys

- Al Barr – lead vocals
- Tim Brennan – guitar, vocals
- Ken Casey – lead vocals
- Jeff DaRosa – banjo, mandolin, acoustic guitars, vocals
- Matt Kelly – drums, percussion, vocals
- James Lynch – guitars, vocals

Additional musicians

- Lee Forshner – bagpipes
- Kevin Rheault – bass guitar

== Charts ==
Chart performance for Turn Up That Dial
| Chart (2021) | Peak position |
|---|---|
| Australian Albums (ARIA) | 92 |
| Austrian Albums (Ö3 Austria) | 9 |
| Belgian Albums (Ultratop Flanders) | 44 |
| Belgian Albums (Ultratop Wallonia) | 53 |
| Dutch Albums (Album Top 100) | 51 |
| French Albums (SNEP) | 87 |
| German Albums (Offizielle Top 100) | 4 |
| Scottish Albums (OCC) | 20 |
| Swedish Albums (Sverigetopplistan) | 55 |
| Swiss Albums (Schweizer Hitparade) | 15 |
| UK Independent Albums (OCC) | 8 |
| UK Rock & Metal Albums (OCC) | 2 |
| US Billboard 200 | 74 |
| US Independent Albums (Billboard) | 9 |
| US Top Alternative Albums (Billboard) | 9 |
| US Top Rock Albums (Billboard) | 13 |
