= Tim Brennan =

American musician (born 1983)

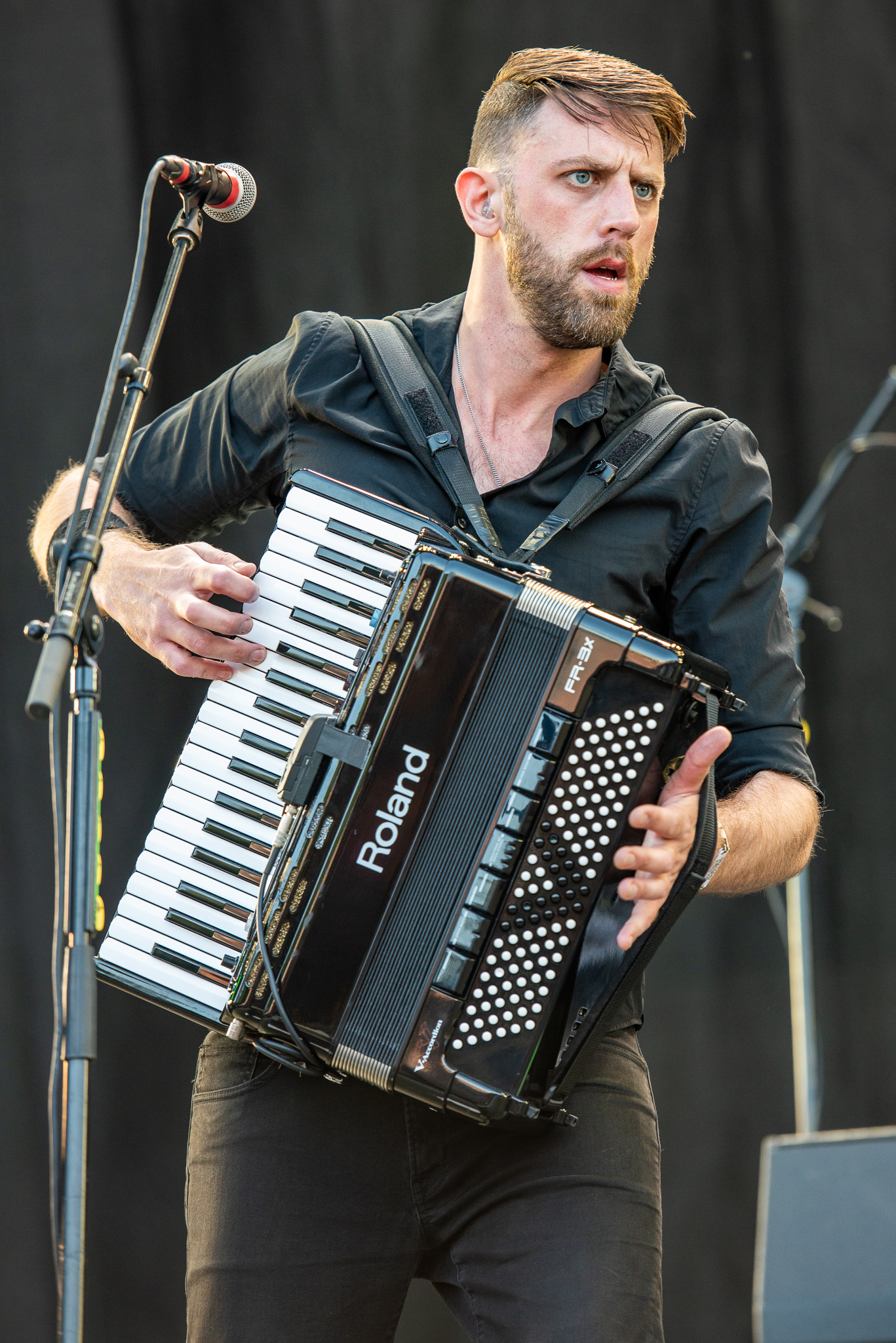
- Brennan in 2019

Background information
- Born: 13 May 1983 (age 43); West Hartford, Connecticut, U.S.
- Genres: Celtic punk; hard rock; rock and roll; punk rock
- Instruments: Guitar; drums; accordion; tin whistle; banjo; mandolin; bouzouki; piano
- Years active: 1996–present
- Labels: Born & Bred; Hellcat

Tim Brennan is an American musician who is a lead guitarist, vocalist and one of the primary songwriters of the Boston Celtic punk group Dropkick Murphys.

== Early life and career ==
Born in West Hartford, Connecticut, Brennan played drums for numerous punk, hardcore and rock bands in Connecticut where he graduated from Kingswood-Oxford preparatory high school in West Hartford CT in 2000 before moving to Worcester MA to attend Assumption University. While in high school, Tim had a teacher who gave him a Pogues cassette tape. Tim learned how to play the tin whistle while listening to that tape. Later, the same teacher gave Tim the Dropkick Murphys album Do or Die thus fully introducing Tim to Celtic punk music. In 2003, Brennan was asked to join the Dropkick Murphys on tour to sell merchandise on the Warped Tour. While on tour they had him play accordion on a few songs. When the Warped Tour ended Tim went back to college to finish his degree. A month after being back in school, he got a call that the Dropkick mandolin player had left the band and they asked Tim to join full time. He joined the band full-time as the accordion/mandolin/tin whistle/banjo player. Brennan also played in the band Gimme Danger along with Marc Orrell, James Lynch, and Ben Karnavas. When Orrell left the Dropkick Murphys, Brennan became the band's lead guitarist, but also continued to play the accordion. Tim continues to play the tin whistle on all Dropkick Murphys recordings despite having switched to lead guitar. Brennan also played drums in the band Double Nines with Dropkick Murphys' tech Kevin Rheault.

On September 10, 2014 Tim appeared on Ken Reid's TV Guidance Counselor Podcast. On February 17, 2017 Tim appeared on the Song Exploder podcast. On June 9, 2017 Tim appeared on the Mike Herrera Hour Podcast.

== Personal life ==
On April 22, 2009, the Dropkick Murphys appeared on stage with Bruce Springsteen & the E Street Band during their stop in Boston on the Working on a Dream Tour. The band joined in on Springsteen's songs "Glory Days" and "American Land". During the show, Brennan proposed to his girlfriend Diana onstage, which was followed by a performance of the Springsteen song "So Young And in Love".

== Discography ==
with Dropkick Murphys

- Tessie (2004)
- The Warrior's Code (2005)
- The Meanest of Times (2007)
- Live on Lansdowne, Boston MA (2010)
- Going Out in Style (2011)
- Live at Fenway (2012)
- Signed and Sealed in Blood (2013)
- Rose Tattoo: For Boston Charity EP (2013)
- 11 Short Stories of Pain & Glory (2017)
- Turn Up That Dial (2021)
- This Machine Still Kills Fascists (2022)
- Okemah Rising (2023)
