= Haywire 617 =

Haywire
- Also known as: Haywire
- Origin: Boston, Massachusetts, U.S.
- Genres: Street punk, hardcore punk, Oi!
- Years active: 2023–present
- Label: Roadrunner Records
- Spinoff of: The Chisel

Haywire 617 is an American hardcore band from Boston, Massachusetts. The group formed in the summer of 2023, rising to prominence touring across the United States playing 96 shows in 100 days. They have released two albums and three EPs. They released a split EP with Dropkick Murphys called New England Forever in spring 2026. On October 2nd, their sophomore album, “I DON’T WANNA SAY GOODBYE” released, with the record label Roadrunner Records.

== History ==
Haywire was formed in 2023 by frontman Austin Sparkman (ex-member of Buried Dreams, Conservative Military Image, Rude Awakening, Skinhead, the Chisel, and Yellow Stitches) in Boston, Massachusetts. On November 15, 2023, Haywire released their debut single "Poser Disposer", then on December 5, 2023, they announced their first album Conditioned For Demolition would be released on January 3, 2024, via Daze Records. They also released a second single "Haywire" that same day. Haywire played their first live show on December 10, 2023, at The Middle East, supporting Think I Care and The Wrong Side at the For The Children benefit event. Conditioned For Demolition featured multiple collaborations with musicians including Bryan Harris of Death Before Dishonor, Adam of CMI, and Chubby Charles of Chubby and the Gang. The New Noise Magazine gave the album a 3.5/5 rating.

After opening for Terror on a West Coast tour in the Fall of 2024, Haywire released a four EP titled FOR BETTER OR FOR WORSE on November 7, 2024. In May of 2025, Haywire served as the opening act on Pain of Truth and Sunami’s "Coast to Coast" tour. Following this Haywire embarked on their own US headlining tour dubbed as the "Shirts vs Skins" tour which lasted from early May of 2025, to early August of that year spanning 71 dates. In late August the band teamed up with Friends Family Forever Merch to hold a local community school drive to help get free backpacks and school supplies. On December 7, Haywire headlined the inaugural Boston For The Children festival which doubled as a toy drive. On December 10, lead singer Austin Sparkman was officially acknowledged by the Commonwealth of Massachusetts for his community work and holiday toy drives.

In January of 2026, Haywire headlined a US tour alongside Missing Link and Cross Disbelief Revamp. They then supported the Dropkick Murphys on their "For the People...In the Pit St. Patrick's Day" Tour which ran from February 9, 2026, to March 17, 2026. This tour culminated in an eight song split EP between the two titled New England Forever. Haywire then went on tour of Europe and Japan during the Summer, and are scheduled to tour Australia with Feel the Pain in August. On August 15, it was announced the band had signed with Roadrunner Records to release their second studio album I Don't Wanna Say Goodbye.

== Discography ==
=== Studio albums ===
- Conditioned For Demolition (2024)
- I Don't Wanna Say Goodbye (2026)

=== EPs ===
- FOR BETTER OR FOR WORSE (2024)
- SHIRTS VS. SKINS (split with No Guard) (2025)
- New England Forever (split with Dropkick Murphys) (2026)

=== Singles ===
- "Poser Disposer" — ft Colin Campbell (2023)
- "Like a Train" — ft Adam Voss (2023)
- "Haywire" (2023)

=== Music videos ===
- "Poser Disposer" (2023)
- "Is What It Is Ain't What It Ain't" (2024)
- "Feeling Depressed (2024)
- "Clocktower Place (2024)
- "Summer Nights" (2025)
- "Hang Up The Telephone" (2026)

== Awards and nominations ==
Boston Music Awards

| Year | Nominee / work | Award | Result |
|---|---|---|---|
| 2025 | SHIRTS VS. SKINS | Album / EP of the Year (1 million + streams) | Nominated |
| 2025 | Haywire | New Artist of the Year | Nominated |
| 2025 | Haywire | Live Artist of the Year | Nominated |
| 2025 | Haywire | Punk / Hardcore Artist of the Year | Won |

== See also ==
- Boston hardcore
