= 11 Short Stories of Pain & Glory =

Studio album by Dropkick Murphys
- Released: January 6, 2017
- Recorded: 2016; El Paso, TX
- Genres: Celtic punk; folk punk
- Length: 38:40
- Label: Born & Bred
- Producer: Ted Hutt

Dropkick Murphys chronology
Rose Tattoo: For Boston Charity (2013)	11 Short Stories of Pain & Glory (2017)	Turn Up That Dial (2021)

Deluxe Edition cover
- 11 Short Stories of Pain & Glory: Deluxe Edition

Singles from 11 Short Stories of Pain & Glory
- 1. "Blood" Released: November 3, 2016; 2. "You'll Never Walk Alone" Released: December 2, 2016; 3. "Paying My Way" Released: December 16, 2016; 4. "Until the Next Time" Released: June 6, 2017

Professional ratings
Aggregate scores
Source	Rating
Metacritic	76/100
Review scores
Source	Rating
AllMusic	4/5 stars
Newsday	A
PopMatters	7/10 stars

11 Short Stories of Pain & Glory is the ninth studio album by American band Dropkick Murphys, released January 6, 2017 on their Born & Bred Records label. The band's first studio release in four years, the album made its debut at number 8 on the Billboard Hot 200 chart, the band's second highest album debut (after Going Out in Style debuted at number 6).

== Background ==
In May 2016, the band started posting videos from the recording of the album in El Paso, Texas which they said expected to have released by the end of the year or early 2017.

"To me, the whole journey starts with the fact we actually agreed to go – and then went – to Texas. Because we've never left home to make a record. As everyone's lives have become crazier and busier with kids and families, it's gotten harder to buckle down at home. We decided to leave Boston, go down to literally the middle of nowhere and lock ourselves in a room" Ken Casey said.

11 Short Stories of Pain & Glory was officially announced as the album's title on November 3, 2016, and a video for the song "Blood" was released on the same day. "You'll Never Walk Alone" and "Paying My Way", which also had a music video, followed as singles. All three songs were given away as digital downloads to people who pre-ordered the album.

The album was influenced by the band's work with The Claddagh Fund, a charity the band established in 2009 to help support addiction recovery as well as children's and veterans' organizations. "Rebels with a Cause" was written about kids who are given up on, and left behind by a system that has written them off as hopeless. "Paying My Way" is about the way up and out of addiction and the dream of bigger and better things in life. "4-15-13" pays homage to the victims of the Boston Marathon Bombing, most of whom the band grew to know personally after visits to their hospital rooms in the aftermath. "Since that day, we felt like not taking the challenge to write a song about what we all went through would be taking the coward's way out. We put more importance on writing that piece of music than anything we've ever done, because if you're going to touch that day, it has to be done right. We went through so many emotions with that whole experience, as did everyone in Boston. It changed the city forever," Casey said. Tim Brennan said of the album "we've stayed true to what the band is and has always been. And we're still expanding on our sound and lyrical content."

In a December 2, 2016 video, Ken Casey discussed the reasons behind the band covering "You'll Never Walk Alone". "As you may know, opiate overdoses are an epidemic in America now particularly in (the Boston) area. I've been to thirty wakes in two years, three this week, one being my cousin, Al's lost a brother in law. It's hit home close to us. I was leaving one of the wakes and this song came on and as I was listening to the lyrics it summed up exactly how I was feeling. Sad, but knowing there is hope. You never have to be alone. I hope you like our version" Casey said.

The album is also the first since 2003's Blackout to not feature bagpipe player Scruffy Wallace who left the band in 2015. While not an official member, Lee Forshner plays bagpipes on the album and also serves as the band's touring bagpipe player.

== Track listing ==
No.	Title	Length
1.	"The Lonesome Boatman"	2:42
2.	"Rebels with a Cause"	3:00
3.	"Blood"	4:01
4.	"Sandlot"	3:44
5.	"First Class Loser"	2:55
6.	"Paying My Way"	3:54
7.	"I Had a Hat"	3:02
8.	"Kicked to the Curb"	3:26
9.	"You'll Never Walk Alone" (Rodgers and Hammerstein)	3:22
10.	"4-15-13"	4:47
11.	"Until the Next Time"	3:47
Total length:		38:40

Deluxe edition bonus disc and Japan edition bonus track
No.	Title	Length
12.	"Sandlot" (Acoustic)	3:39
Total length:		42:33

- The deluxe edition of the album is limited to 5,000 copies and includes a 26-page book featuring the band's hand-written lyrics, behind the scenes photos, guitar tabs, bagpipe notation and a 2-song picture disc featuring "Blood" and an exclusive acoustic version of "Sandlot". The album is also available on Kelly Green vinyl which is limited to 1,000 copies. A limited edition yellow & blue splatter version of the album on vinyl was also released as an exclusive to Newbury Comics.

== Personnel ==
Dropkick Murphys

- Al Barr – lead vocals
- Tim Brennan – guitars, accordion, Mellotron, tin whistle, vocals
- Ken Casey – lead vocals, bass guitar
- Jeff DaRosa – banjo, bouzouki, mandolin, harmonica, acoustic guitars, vocals
- Matt Kelly – drums, percussion, vocals
- James Lynch – guitars, vocals

Additional musicians

- Ted Hutt – percussion
- Lee Forschner – bagpipes (tracks 3, 6, 9, and 11)
- Anthony Dooley – backing vocals (tracks 3, 6, 9 and 11)
- Bryan Hinkley – backing vocals (tracks 3, 6, 9 and 11)
- George Brenner – backing vocals (tracks 3, 6, 9 and 11)
- Griffin Bach – backing vocals (tracks 3, 6, 9, 11), sound engineer
- Jay Cannava – backing vocals (tracks 3, 6, 9 and 11)
- Jesse Ahern – backing vocals (tracks 3, 6, 9 and 11)
- Jimmy Stebar – backing vocals (tracks 3, 6, 9 and 11)
- Jon Marcantonio – backing vocals (tracks 3, 6, 9 and 11)
- Katelyn Sullivan – backing vocals (tracks 3, 6, 9 and 11)
- Larry Reagan – backing vocals (tracks 3, 6, 9 and 11)
- Mike Bloom – backing vocals (tracks 3, 6, 9 and 11)
- Paul Dooley – backing vocals (tracks 3, 6, 9 and 11)
- Quinn Smith – backing vocals (tracks 3, 6, 9 and 11)
- Sandra Squires – backing vocals (tracks 3, 6, 9 and 11)

== Charts ==
Chart performance
Chart (2017)	Peak position
Australian Albums (ARIA)	15
Austrian Albums (Ö3 Austria)	4
Belgian Albums (Ultratop Flanders)	22
Belgian Albums (Ultratop Wallonia)	59
Canadian Albums (Billboard)	21
Dutch Albums (Album Top 100)	36
French Albums (SNEP)	65
German Albums (Offizielle Top 100)	3
Irish Independent Albums (IRMA)	7
New Zealand Heatseekers Albums (RMNZ)	3
Scottish Albums (Official Charts)	36
Swedish Albums (Sverigetopplistan)	24
Swiss Albums (Schweizer Hitparade)	6
UK Albums (Official Charts)	68
UK Independent Albums (Official Charts)	5
UK Rock & Metal Albums (Official Charts)	3
US Billboard 200	8
US Independent Albums (Billboard)	1
US Indie Store Album Sales (Billboard)	1
US Top Alternative Albums (Billboard)	1
US Top Rock Albums (Billboard)	1
