= The Scratch (band) =

Irish trad/metal band

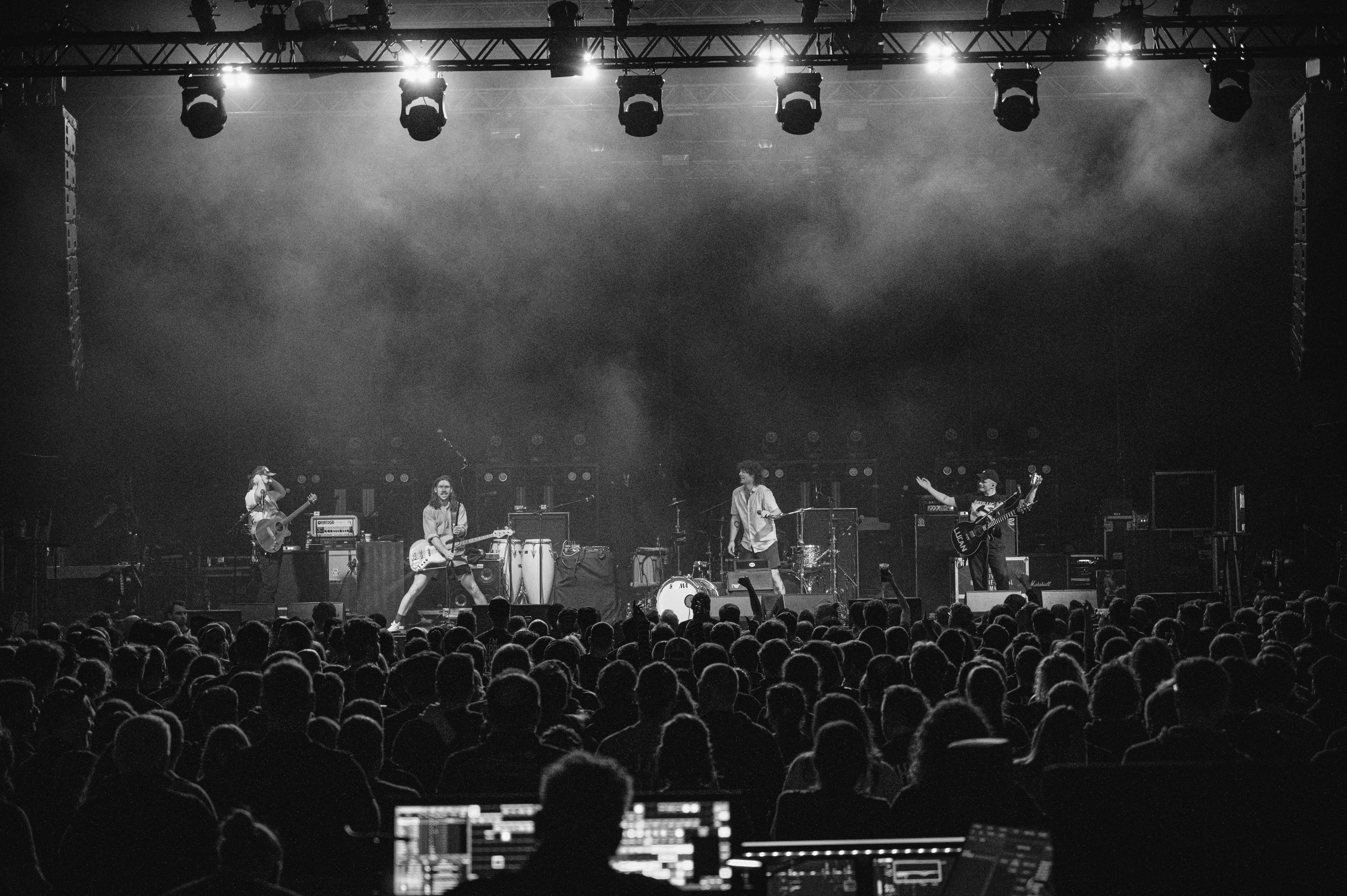
- The Scratch, live at the Gasometer, Vienna, Austria.

Background information
- Origin: Dublin, Ireland
- Genres: Folk rock; Celtic music; folk metal; avant-garde metal; progressive rock; Irish traditional music
- Years active: 2016–present
- Label: Sony Music Entertainment
- Members: Conor Dockery; Daniel Lang; Cathal McKenna; Gary Regan
- Past members: Jordan O'Leary; Peter Keogh
- Website: thescratch.ie

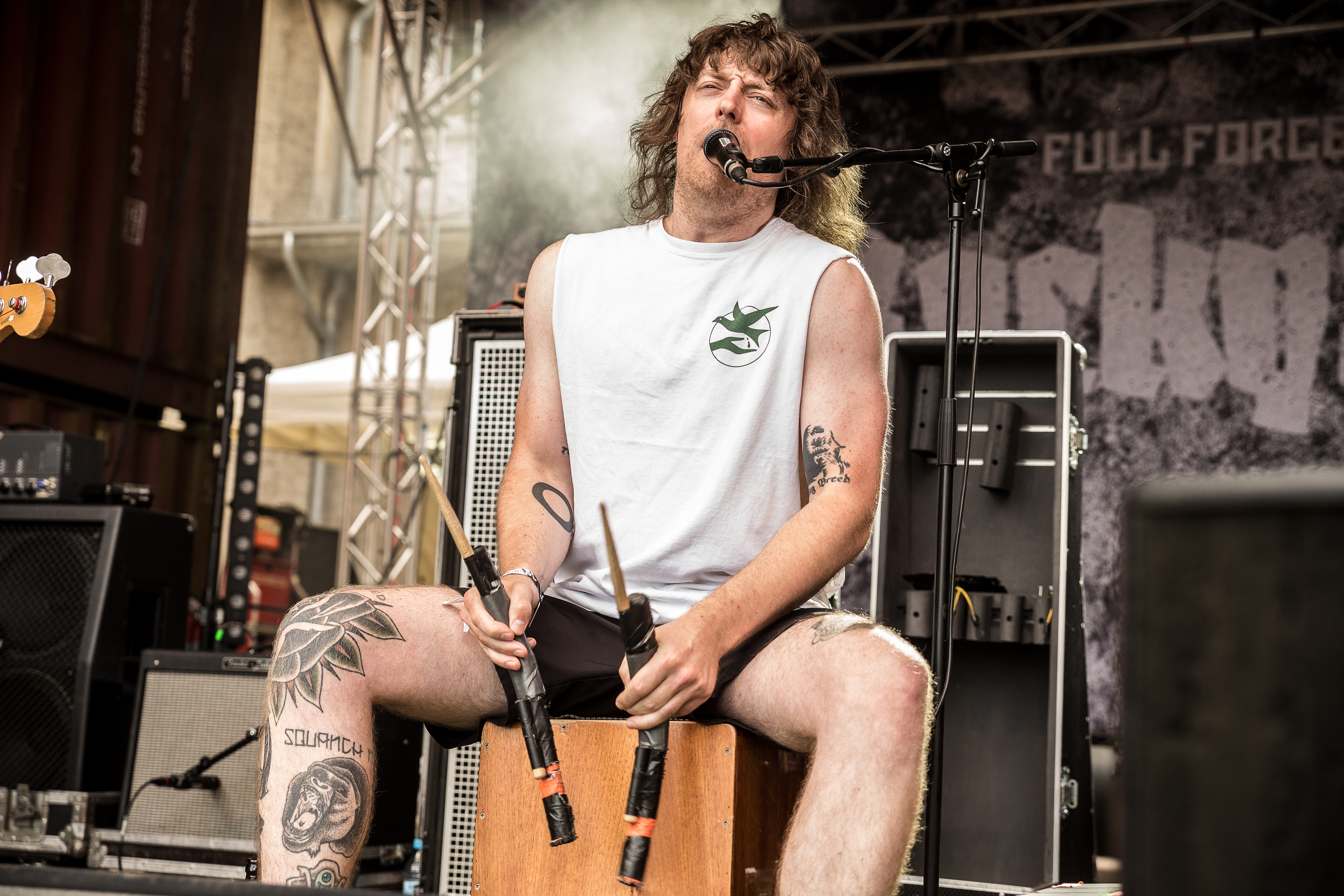
Percussionist and singer Daniel "Lango" Lang

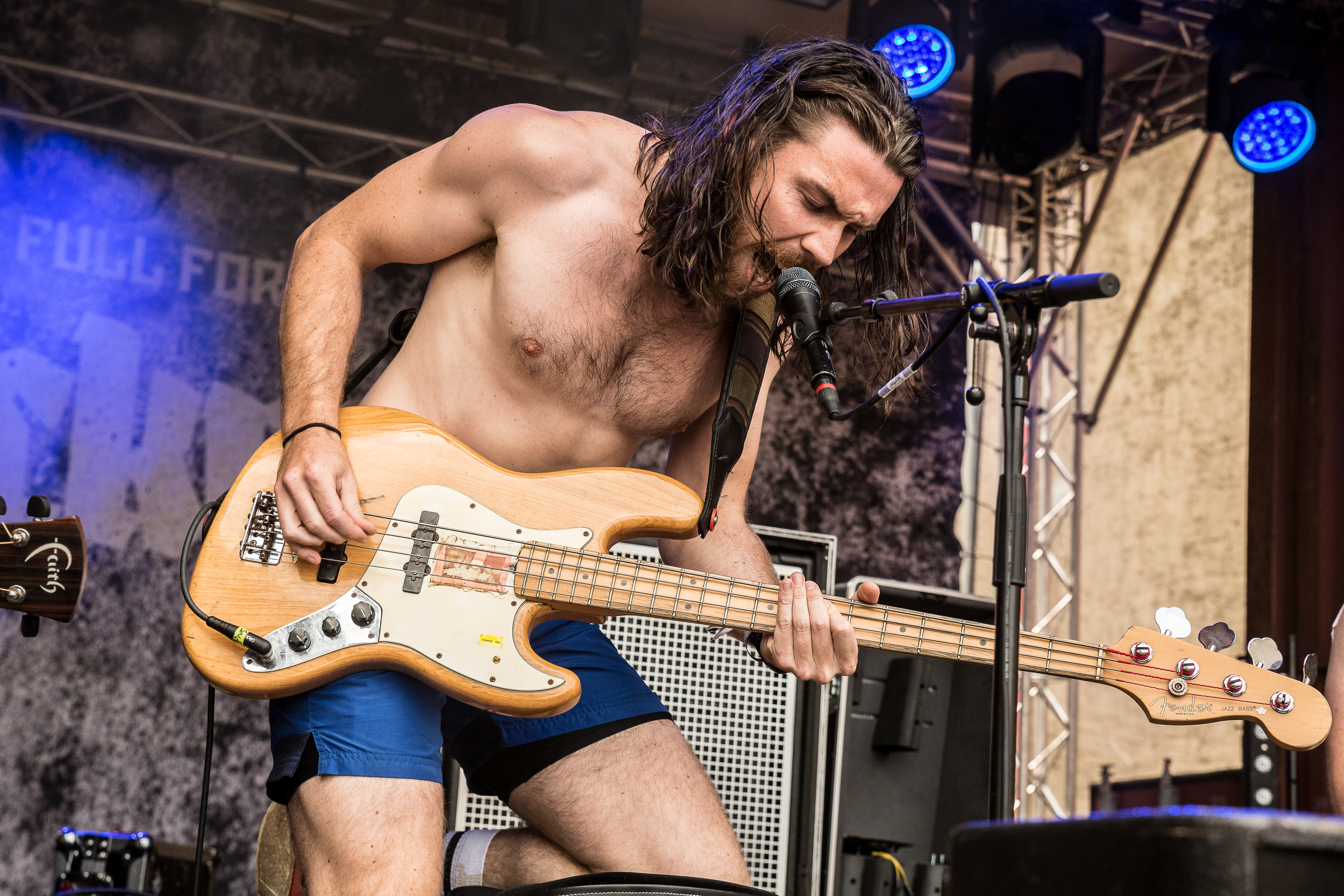
Bassist Cathal McKenna

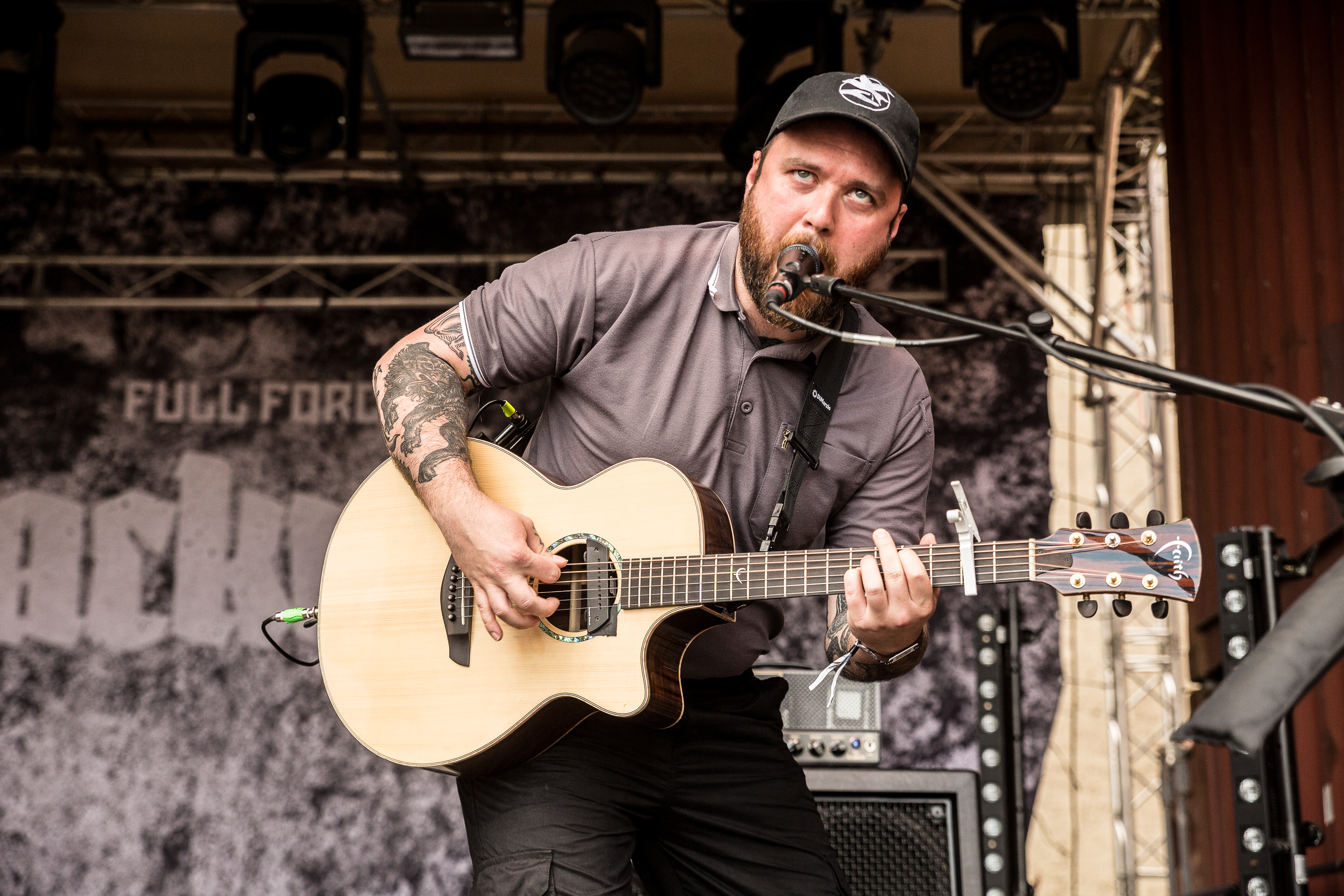
Jordan "Jordo" O'Leary (guitar, lead vocals)

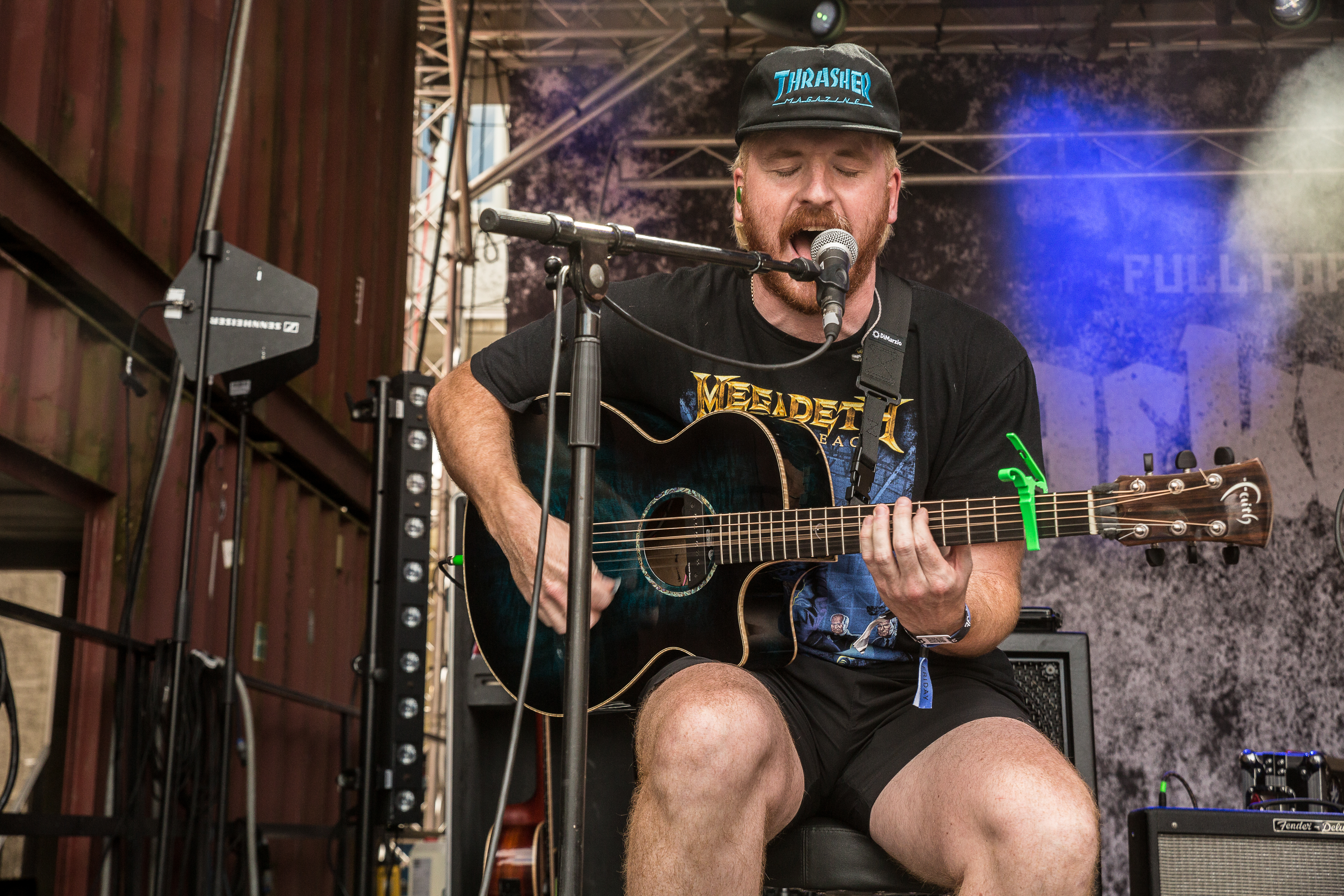
Conor "Dock" Dockery (guitar)

The Scratch are an Irish band based in Dublin, whose music blends Irish traditional music and heavy metal.

== Career ==
The Scratch were founded in Perrystown in 2016 by three of the five members (Jordan O'Leary, Daniel Lang, Conor Dockery) of Red Enemy, a heavy metal group, joined by bass player Cathal McKenna.

They released their first album Couldn't Give a Rats in 2020, and their second Mind Yourself in 2023. It was nominated for the Choice Music Prize.

In December 2024 Jordan O'Leary announced his departure from the band. He was replaced by Gary Regan.

== Members ==
- Conor "Dock" Dockery – guitar, backing vocals (2016–present)
- Gary "Snakeskin" Regan – guitar, backing vocals (2024–present)
- Cathal McKenna – bass, backing vocals (2022–present)
- Daniel "Lango" Lang – cajón, percussion, lead vocals (2016–present)

=== Former members ===
- Jordan O'Leary – guitar, backing vocals (2016–2024)
- Peter Keogh – bass (2016–2022)

== Discography ==
Albums

- Couldn't Give a Rats (2020)
- Mind Yourself (2023)
- Pull Like a Dog (2026)

EPs

- Old Songs (2018)
- The Whole Buzz (2019)

Other

- For the People (2025) (the band appears on two tracks on the Dropkick Murphys thirteenth album)
