= The Bombpops =

American punk rock band

- Origin: San Diego, California, U.S.
- Genres: Pop punk, punk rock, skate punk
- Years active: 2007–present
- Labels: Fat Wreck Chords, Red Scare
- Members: Jen Razavi; Josh Lewis; Neil Wayne; Remmington Pascone
- Past members: Poli van Dam; Dylan Wade; Austin Missett; Trevor Robertson
- Website: thebombpops.com

The Bombpops are an American punk rock band formed in San Diego, California, in 2007. The band was formed by co-front women Jen Razavi and Poli van Dam; it has had many formation changes since 2007. The band is signed to Fat Wreck Chords.

== History ==
=== Formation ===
The band originally consisted of Poli van Dam (guitar/vocals) and Jen Razavi (guitars/vocals). Over the years, the band went through lineup changes, having three different drummers and six different bassists before Josh Lewis (drums) and Neil Wayne (bass) joined the band.

Van Dam was 13 years old when she briefly met Razavi, who was 18, through friends. They met again years later at a local music studio in their home town where van Dam was playing in an 80's power metal band, The Vodka Dolls, as guitarist and Razavi was invited to play bass. They played together in the band for some time but decided to start their own band since power metal wasn't a music genre either of them liked. Razavi then started to visit van Dam's house after she would get home from school to play and they wrote songs together. Later, they recruited Razavi's school friends, Austin Missett & Dylan Wade, to play bass & drums to compete at a Battle Of The Bands at van Dam's highschool. Wayne and Lewis had been friends since they were little and had played in bands together before The Bombpops. But as Razavi says, "we’ve been the Bombpops for about ten years, but we really weren’t the Bombpops until we got these guys in the band.”

Razavi said in an interview that the band name was chosen on a hot day at Wade's house. An ice cream van was passing by and the drummer ordered a Lickety Lick Bombpop. At first the band was going to be called The Lickety Lick Bombpops but afterwards they decided The Bombpops sounded better.

=== Releases ===
The Bombpops released their first two EP's independently, self titled in 2009 and Like I Care in November 2010. The band released their third EP Stole the TV in October 2011 through Red Scare Industries. In January 2015 they self-released another EP named Can of Worms. The Bombpops also toured Europe in 2015, performing 26 shows including one with the Gamits. The Gamits' frontman, Chris Fogel, wound up producing the Bombpop's debut album.

In April 2016 the band began to record their first full-length album Fear of Missing Out in Denver at the Black in Bluhm Music studio. The album came out on February 10, 2017, through Fat Wreck Chords. The band is well known in the Californian pop punk, punk rock scene after receiving exposure playing with big names such as NOFX, Descendents, and Bad Religion.

The band released Death in Venice Beach on March 13, 2020. The album made Alternative Press' 50 Best 2020 Albums list. A review on Wall of Sound said the album was "dark, edgy, and poignant." Alt Press's review found the "tandem guitar/vocal team of Poli Van Dam and Jen Razavi was... tight and taut. But their gloves-off confessional songwriting (“Double Arrows Down,” “Zero Remorse,” “Sad To Me”) feels like a contemporary reading of the legendary BFF outlaw movie Thelma & Louise."

=== Poli van Dam's departure ===
In August 2021, Poli van Dam said in an Instagram post that she would not be joining the band on their upcoming tour due to family and health issues. She was replaced on tour by the band's guitar tech, Remmington. In November she appeared on an episode of the Jughead's Basement podcast, announcing that she had left the band.

=== Razavi and Dropkick Murphys ===
In February 2022 it was announced that Dropkick Murphys vocalist Al Barr was forced to drop off of the band's 2022 St. Patrick's Day Tour and their 2022 summer tour in Europe to take care of his ailing mother, who is battling Lewy Body Dementia. The Bombpops have been touring with the Dropkick Murphys and Razavi along with Mikey Rivkees of the Rumjacks and Jesse Ahern began assisting on vocals during the band's performances.

== Discography ==
- The BombPops (EP) (2009)
- Like I Care (EP) (2010)
- Stole the TV (EP) (2011)
- Can of Worms (EP) (2015)
- Fear of Missing Out (2017)
- First Five Years (Compilation) (2017)
- Dear Beer (EP) (2018)
- Death in Venice Beach (2020)
