= New England Forever =

EP by Dropkick Murphys, Haywire
- Released: March 17, 2026
- Recorded: 2026
- Genres: Celtic punk, hardcore punk
- Label: Dummy Luck

Dropkick Murphys, Haywire chronology
For the People (2025)	New England Forever (2026)	20th Century Paddy: Songs of Shane MacGowan (2026)

Singles from New England Forever
- 1. "Citizen I.C.E. (Dropkick Murphys feat. Haywire)" Released: February 4, 2026; 2. "New England Forever (Haywire feat. Dropkick Murphys)" Released: February 18, 2026; 3. "Only the Strong" Released: April 9, 2026

New England Forever is a split EP by American Celtic punk band Dropkick Murphys and Boston hardcore punk band Haywire that was released on March 17, 2026, on Dummy Luck Records on streaming services; however, it was first made available as an exclusive 12" vinyl during the Dropkick Murphys' For the People...In the Pit St. Patrick's Day Tour which ran from February 9, 2026, to March 17, 2026, and featured Haywire and The Aggrolites as opening acts.

== Background ==
The EP features eight songs. Each band contributed two new original songs, two songs performed together, and each band covered a one-song from the other band.

"Citizen I.C.E." was released as a single to streaming services on February 4, 2026, and is a re-working of the Dropkick Murphys' song "Citizen C.I.A." which originally appeared on their 2005 album, The Warrior's Code. The song was re-written in direct response to the takeover by ICE agents in U.S. cities, mainly in the state of Minnesota, and the deaths of U.S. citizens Renee Good and Alex Pretti at the hands of ICE during Operation Metro Surge. “As Americans are being executed in the street, we feel it is our duty to raise consciousness, and be one of the voices speaking against this nightmare. "Citizen I.C.E." is FOR THE PEOPLE. Stand strong against tyranny. Use it however you want. In Solidarity, with Love, Dropkick Murphys" the band said in a statement."New England Forever" was released as the album's second single on February 18, 2026.

On March 13, 2026 on the opening night of their Spirit of '96 30th Birthday Celebration and annual St. Patrick's Day homestand, the Dropkick Murphys played their live debut of "Only the Strong" ahead of the EP release. The band announced that "Only the Strong" would be released as the album's third single and music video on April 9, 2026.

== Track listing ==
All tracks are written by Dropkick Murphys and Haywire.

For the People track listing
No.	Title	Length
1.	"Citizen I.C.E." (Dropkick Murphy feat. Haywire)	1:23
2.	"Only the Strong" (Dropkick Murphys)	2:40
3.	"Solidarity" (Dropkick Murphys)	2:18
4.	"Always By My Side" (Dropkick Murphys covering Haywire)	3:11
5.	"New England Forever" (Haywire feat. Dropkick Murphys)	2:05
6.	"Hang Up the Telephone" (Haywire)	2:54
7.	"The Henchmen" (Haywire)	1:19
8.	"The Boys Are Back" (Haywire covering Dropkick Murphys)	3:26

== Charts ==
Chart performance for New England Forever
Chart (2026)	Peak position
French Rock & Metal Albums (SNEP)	80
Irish Compilation Albums (IRMA)	29
