= National ShamrockFest =

Musical festival in America

- Genre: Celtic music, Folk music, Rock music
- Dates: Saturday near Saint Patrick's Day (varies)
- Locations: Washington, D.C., US
- Years active: 2000-2019, 2022-
- Website: Official Website (National ShamrockFest)

National ShamrockFest, also commonly referred to as ShamrockFest, is a one-day music festival held in Washington, D.C. to celebrate Saint Patrick's Day.

ShamrockFest is held in a very large, paved, parking-lot type of area at Robert F. Kennedy Memorial Stadium called the RFK Stadium Festival Fairgounds. (The festival is not held inside the stadium itself.) The festival is held on a Saturday near Saint Patrick's Day, typically from about 1pm to 9pm. The festival goes on regardless of weather, which can often be cold and rainy in Washington, D.C., in March. Typically, about 50 artists perform on approximately 7 stages for an audience of about 40,000 attendees. Though some emphasis is placed on Celtic music and other folk music, rock artists also perform at ShamrockFest.

ShamrockFest also includes carnival rides and games, craft vendors, food and drink vendors, and roving entertainers.

The RFK Stadium Festival Fairgrounds is cordoned off into two areas for ShamrockFest: one "main area" and one "VIP area." Entry into the VIP area requires purchase of a special, higher-priced ticket and is open to adults at least 21 only. There are additional stages, events, and restrooms in the VIP area. Beer in the VIP area is free to VIP attendees.

The larger main area of the fairgrounds is open to all ages; children under the age of 12 are admitted free. Food and drink (including beer and wine) are available for sale at vendor booths around the parking lot.

Since the RFK Stadium parking lot is given over to the festival, there is minimal available parking at ShamrockFest. Many attendees use the Washington Metro to travel to and from ShamrockFest, with the Stadium-Armory Metro stop being the closest.

Because the festival is associated with Saint Patricks' Day, many attendees wear green clothing or other Saint Patrick's Day ornamentation.

In 2014, Red Frog Events acquired the festival from the previous owner, GoCity Events. Red Frog Events is an event production company based in Chicago, IL that has been recognized for its award-winning company culture and innovative brands. They produce Firefly Music Festival, Big Barrel Country Music Festival, Warrior Dash and American Beer Classic in addition to ShamrockFest.

This festival went on hiatus in 2020-21, and resumed in 2022.
