= Live on Lansdowne, Boston MA =

Live album by Dropkick Murphys
- Released: March 16, 2010
- Recorded: March 12 – 17, 2009
- Venue: House of Blues (Boston)
- Genre: Celtic punk
- Length: 73:30
- Label: Born & Bred

Dropkick Murphys chronology
The Meanest of Times (2007)	Live on Lansdowne, Boston MA (2010)	Going Out in Style (2011)

Professional ratings
Review scores
Source	Rating
Allmusic	4/5 stars
About.com	5/5 stars
Sputnikmusic	4/5 stars

Live on Lansdowne, Boston MA is the second live album and the third live DVD by the celtic punk band, Dropkick Murphys. It was recorded at seven shows over the span of six nights of their annual St Patrick's Day weekend shows in Boston, Massachusetts. The album has an entirely different track list to the previous live album, Live on St. Patrick's Day From Boston, MA, apart from ″Forever 2009″, a new version of "Forever".

== Track list ==
No.	Title	Length
1.	"Famous for Nothing"	3:03
2.	"The State of Massachusetts"	4:01
3.	"Johnny, I Hardly Knew Ya"	4:52
4.	"Time to Go"	2:36
5.	"Sunshine Highway"	3:19
6.	"(F)lannigan’s Ball"	3:46
7.	"Bastards on Parade"	3:58
8.	"God Willing"	3:25
9.	"Caught in a Jar"	2:37
10.	"Captain Kelly’s Kitchen"	2:39
11.	"Citizen C.I.A"	2:13
12.	"Fields of Athenry"	4:43
13.	"Your Spirit’s Alive"	2:30
14.	"The Warrior’s Code"	4:11
15.	"The Dirty Glass" (featuring Liza Graves)	3:53
16.	"Tessie"	5:25
17.	"Forever 2009"	3:37
18.	"Worker’s Song"	3:28
19.	"Kiss Me, I'm Shitfaced"	6:36
20.	"I'm Shipping Up to Boston" (featuring The Mighty Mighty Bosstones)	2:38
Total length:		73:30

iTunes bonus tracks
No.	Title	Length
1.	"10 Years of Service"	2:48
2.	"Shattered"	3:26
3.	"Wheel of Misfortune"	4:06
4.	"Tomorrow's Industry"	2:56
5.	"Baba O'Riley"	4:08
Total length:		90:54

DVD track list
No.	Title	Length
0.	"intro"	0:15
1.	"Famous for Nothing"	2:53
2.	"The State of Massachusetts"	4:03
3.	"Johnny, I Hardly Knew Ya"	4:46
4.	"Time to Go"	2:39
5.	"Sunshine Highway"	3:38
6.	"(F)lannigan’s Ball"	3:51
7.	"Bastards on Parade"	4:10
8.	"God Willing"	3:30
9.	"Caught in a Jar"	2:41
10.	"Captain Kelly’s Kitchen"	2:48
11.	"Citizen C.I.A."	1:32
12.	"Fields of Athenry"	5:02
13.	"Your Spirit’s Alive"	2:42
14.	"The Warrior’s Code"	2:42
15.	"The Dirty Glass" (featuring Liza Graves)	5:12
16.	"Tessie"	4:41
17.	"Forever 2009"	4:41
18.	"Worker’s Song"	3:29
19.	"Kiss Me, I'm Shitfaced"	6:42
20.	"I'm Shipping Up to Boston (Instrumental)" (featuring The Mighty Mighty Bosstones)	2:53
21.	"Credits"	1:37
Total length:		76:12

== Charts ==
Chart performance
Chart (2010)	Peak position
Belgian Albums (Ultratop Flanders)	89
Belgian Albums (Ultratop Wallonia)	91
Canadian Albums (Nielsen SoundScan)	59
Swedish Albums (Sverigetopplistan)	38
UK Independent Albums (Official Charts)	25
US Billboard 200	25
US Independent Albums (Billboard)	2
US Indie Store Album Sales (Billboard)	9
US Top Alternative Albums (Billboard)	6
US Top Rock Albums (Billboard)	8
