= Rose Tattoo (song) =

- Cover art for the Rose Tattoo: For Boston Charity EP

Single by Dropkick Murphys

from the album Signed and Sealed in Blood
- Released: November 7, 2012
- Recorded: May – July 2012 at Q Division Studios (Somerville, Massachusetts)
- Genre: Celtic folk; folk punk
- Length: 5:06 (Original version); 3:39 (Re-recorded version)
- Label: Born & Bred
- Songwriter: Dropkick Murphys
- Producer: Ted Hutt

Dropkick Murphys chronology
Signed and Sealed in Blood (2013)	Rose Tattoo: For Boston Charity (2013)	11 Short Stories of Pain & Glory (2017)

"Rose Tattoo" is a song by American Celtic punk band Dropkick Murphys. It was originally released as the lead single from the band's eighth studio album Signed and Sealed in Blood on November 7, 2012. It was re-recorded with featured vocals from Bruce Springsteen and re-released on May 14, 2013 as part of the Rose Tattoo: For Boston Charity EP, which was released shortly after the Boston Marathon bombing in April 2013. A music video for the original version of the song was uploaded on November 8, 2012 to the band's official YouTube channel. The version featuring Springsteen peaked at number 25 on the Billboard Hot Rock Songs chart.

== Meaning ==
The song is about one man's tattoos in general, including a specifically mentioned rose tattoo. The rose tattoo itself is one of Casey's own tattoos, featured on his arm, and is a memorial to his grandfather, who raised Casey after his father died.

"He taught me most things that make me who I am today," Casey says. "He was a big union guy in Boston. It's in a visible place for me, and I look down and I see it a lot. He was such an inspiring man that it inspires me. Oftentimes, I just catch it out of the corner of my eye and it literally changes my mood when I think of him and what a strong individual he was."

== Music video ==
The official music video for the song, lasting five minutes and twenty-six seconds, was uploaded on November 8, 2012 to the band's official YouTube channel.

== Track listing ==
=== Original single ===
No.	Title	Length
1.	"Rose Tattoo"	5:06

=== Rose Tattoo: For Boston Charity EP ===
No.	Title	Length
1.	"Rose Tattoo" (featuring Bruce Springsteen)	3:39
2.	"Don't Tear Us Apart" (Live Acoustic)	3:50
3.	"Jimmy Collins' Wake" (Live Acoustic)	3:50
Total length:		11:19

== Charts ==
Chart (2013)	Peak position
US Hot Rock & Alternative Songs (Billboard)	25

== Release history ==
Region	Date	Label	Format
United States	November 7, 2012	Born & Bred	Digital download (single)
United States	May 14, 2013	Born & Bred	Digital download (EP)
