= The Rumjacks =

Celtic punk rock band

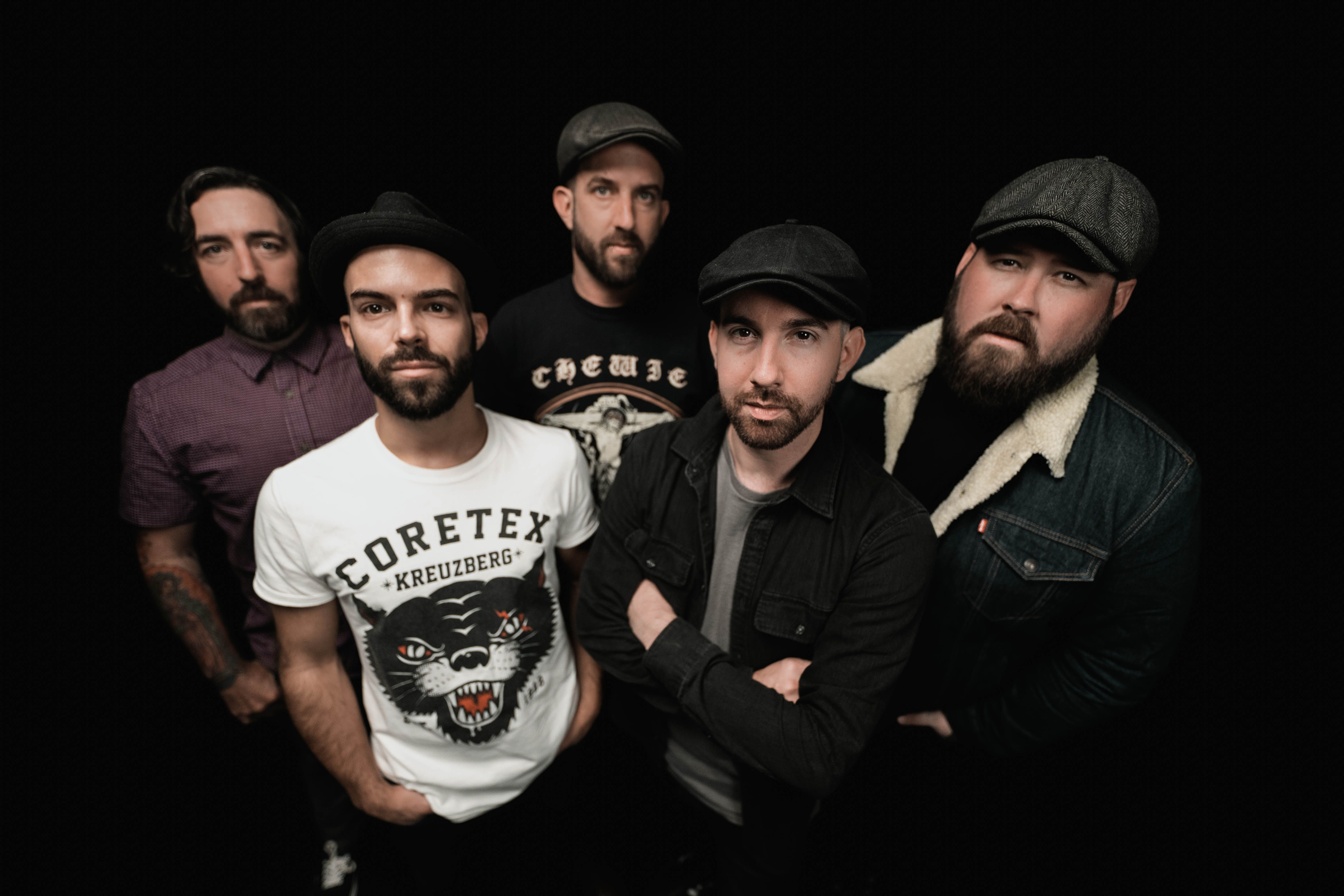
- The Rumjacks (2020)

Background information
- Origin: Sydney, Australia
- Genres: pirate metal, hardcore punk, Celtic punk, folk punk, punk rock, hard rock
- Years active: 2008–present
- Label: Four Four
- Members: Mike Rivkees; Johnny McKelvey; Gabriel Whitborne; Adam Kenny; Pietro Della Sala; Kyle Goyette
- Past members: Anthony Matters; Will Swan; Frankie McLaughlin
- Website: therumjacks.com

The Rumjacks are a celtic punk band originally formed in Sydney, Australia in 2008. Known for their loud and energetic live shows, the band has released five studio albums, two live albums, and a series of EPs and singles. In 2016, the Rumjacks relocated to various parts of Europe, where they currently live and tour.

One of the band's best-known songs, "An Irish Pub Song", became a viral hit and has earned over 100 million views on YouTube.

== Members ==
Current members

- Mike Rivkees – vocals, tin whistle, acoustic guitar (2020–present)
- Gabriel Whitborne – guitar, backing vocals (2008–present)
- Pietro Della Sala – drums (2016–present)
- Adam Kenny – mandolin, bouzouki, banjo, backing vocals (2008–present)
- Johnny McKelvey – bass, backing vocals – (2008–present)
- Kyle Goyette – accordion, backing vocals – (2023–present)

Former members

- Will Swan - accordion (2009)
- Anthony Matters – drums (2008–2016; died 2019)
- Frankie McLaughlin – vocals, tin whistle, guitar (2008–2020)

== History ==
Formed in 2008, the Rumjacks combine a variety of musical influences, including elements of punk rock and traditional Celtic folk. They released their debut EP Hung, Drawn & Portered, which was followed by their second EP Sound as a Pound later in the year. The Rumjacks secured international support from punk legends like U.K Subs, GBH, and Gypsy punk legends Gogol Bordello. After early lineup changes, the band maintained their lineup of lead singer Frankie McLaughlin, bassist Johnny McKelvey, drummer Anthony Matters, guitarist Gabriel Whitbourne, and banjo/mandolin/bouzouki player Adam Kenny recording three critically acclaimed albums together: Gangs of New Holland (2010), Sober and Godless (2015), and Sleeping Rough (2016), before Matters' left after their 2016 European tour.

The Rumjacks have performed on European tours. The first European tour, in 2015 included the Jarocin Festival in Poland and Boomtown in the UK. On their 2016 Euro tour they performed at festivals like Przystanek Woodstock, Mighty Sounds, Punk Rock Holiday, and the Lowlands Festival. The Rumjacks embarked on their first US tour in March 2017, which included performances at San Diego's Get Shamrocked Festival Launch Party and Austin's South by Southwest Music Festival. The band also toured Europe in 2019.

Rivkees briefly began filling in for Dropkick Murphys singer Al Barr in February 2022 for some of the band's shows. Barr was forced to drop off of his band's tour to take care of his ailing mother.

McLaughlin continues his carrier as Liptons Orphan. He released an album Dressin' Scottish/ Drinkin' Irish/Talkin' Rubbish in 2024 as well as several singles.

== "An Irish Pub Song" ==
The band had an international breakthrough with their 2011 single, "An Irish Pub Song", which was taken from the 2010 album Gangs of New Holland. The song is an observational commentary on the fact that there are Irish-styled pubs in every part of the world as well as a protest against what the band saw as a commercialization and inauthentic expression of Irish diaspora culture. The song's official music video amassed over 85 million views on YouTube.

In a 2016 article Billboard said that the song was #4 of the 25 "Most Popular St Patricks Day" songs on YouTube for the US demographic, before becoming #5 in 2017, #3 in 2018, and #5 in 2019.

== Saints Preserve Us ==
In early 2018 the band recorded their fourth studio album Saints Preserve Us over two weeks in Milan, Italy at Crono Sound Factory. It was the first album with new drummer Pietro Della Sala. Paul McKenzie from the Real McKenzies was featured on the duet "The Foreman O’Rourke", and Mickey Rickshaw appeared on the song "Billy McKinley". The album includes a version of the Irish classic "An poc ar buile" (The Mad Puck Goat), which is sung in Irish. The album was released on 12 October 2018. At the end of 2018, the band toured Southeast Asia for the first time and went to Japan, Malaysia, and Indonesia.

== Collaborations ==
- The Rumjacks featured on the song "Shandon Bells", from The Moorings' 2014 EP Nicky's Detox.
- The band also featured on the Rumpled's "The Ugly Side", from the 2018 album Ashes & Wishes.
- In 2019 the Rumjacks recorded their version of "Christmas in Killarney" for Punk Rock Christmas, Volume 2 released by USA label Cleopatra Records.
- McLaughlin featured on the song "True Story", from The Clan's 2016 album All In The Name Of Folk, and also on Maleducazione Alcolica's song "Hometown", from the band's 2019 album Chiacchiere da bar.
- The Rumjacks feature on “This is Goodbye”, the final track of The Barstool Preachers 2026 album Party Eternal.

== Legal issues ==
McLaughlin was sentenced for three domestic violence offences in 2012: an assault occasioning actual bodily harm committed on 2 March 2010; a further assault occasioning actual bodily harm committed on 18 August 2010; and a common assault committed on 26 September 2010. Due to public backlash, the Rumjacks released another statement in 2016. He was removed from the band in April 2020 due to bad behaviour and violent acts towards band members and support crew .

== Discography ==
=== Studio albums ===
List of albums, with selected details
Title	Details
Gangs of New Holland	Released: September 2010; Label: Laughing Outlaw (LORCD-126); Format: CD, digital, LP
Sober & Godless	Released: February 2015; Label: Black Matilda (BMM001CD); Format: CD, digital, LP
Sleepin' Rough	Released: July 2016; Label: ABC Music (5704243); Format: CD, digital, LP
Saints Preserve Us!	Released: 2018; Label: ABC Music (7704062) / Four Four; Format: CD, digital, LP
Hestia	Released: March 2021; Label: Four Four (3541068); Format: CD, digital, LP
Dead Anthems	Released: February 2025; Label: Four Four (FOUR0008LP); Format: CD, digital, LP

=== Extended plays ===
List of albums, with selected details
Title	Details
Hung, Drawn & Portered	Released: 2009; Label: The Rumjacks (RUMEP1); Format: CD, digital
Sound as a Pound	Released: 2009; Label: The Rumjacks (RUMEP2); Format: CD, digital
Brass for Gold	Released: February 2022; Label: Four Four (3541068); Format: LP, digital
Danny Boy	Released: 2025; Label: Four Four (3541068); Format: LP, digital
