= Dropkick Murphys discography =

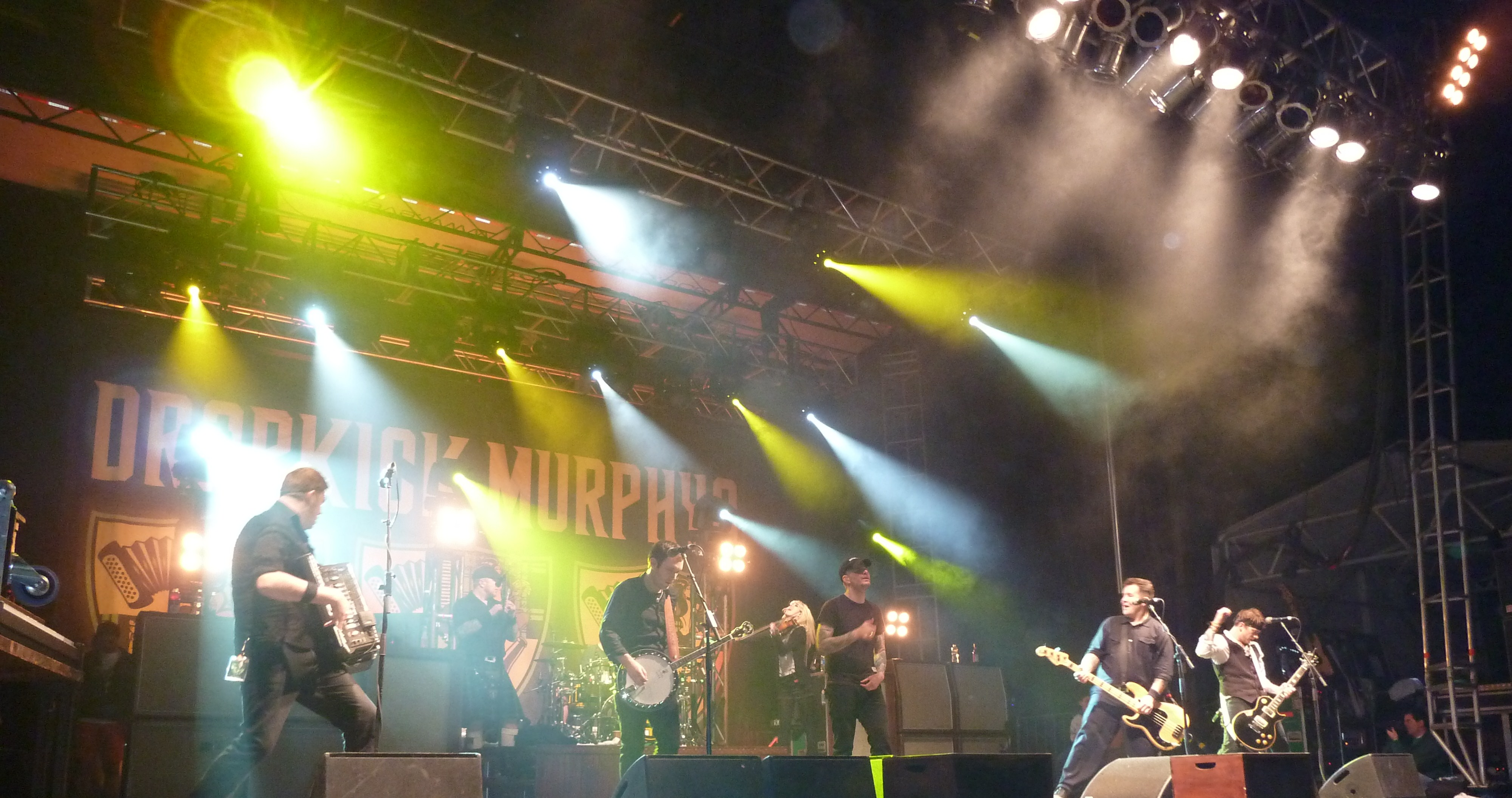
- Dropkick Murphys performing at The National Shamrock Fest in Washington, D.C. in 2011
- Studio albums: 13
- Extended plays: 3
- Live albums: 3
- Compilation albums: 4
- Singles: 44
- Video albums: 2
- Music videos: 60

Irish-American Celtic punk band Dropkick Murphys has released thirteen studio albums, three live albums, four compilation albums, sixteen extended plays, forty-four singles and sixty music videos.

== Albums ==
=== Studio albums ===
List of studio albums, with selected chart positions
Title	Album details	Peak chart positions										Certifications
Title	Album details	US	AUS	AUT	BEL (FL)	FIN	GER	IRL	NLD	SWE	UK	Certifications
Do or Die	Released: January 27, 1998; Label: Hellcat; Formats: CD, LP, digital download	—	—	—	—	—	—	—	—	—	—	
The Gang's All Here	Released: March 16, 1999; Label: Hellcat; Formats: CD, LP, digital download	184	—	—	—	—	—	—	—	—	—	
Sing Loud, Sing Proud!	Released: February 6, 2001; Label: Hellcat; Formats: CD, LP, digital download	144	—	—	—	37	—	—	64	—	—	
Blackout	Released: June 10, 2003; Label: Hellcat; Formats: CD, LP, digital download	83	—	—	—	—	—	—	64	—	—	
The Warrior's Code	Released: June 21, 2005; Label: Hellcat; Formats: CD, LP, digital download	48	80	—	59	—	51	—	76	33	—	RIAA: Gold
The Meanest of Times	Released: September 18, 2007; Label: Born & Bred; Formats: CD, LP, digital download	20	85	72	92	—	38	98	76	18	165	
Going Out in Style	Released: March 1, 2011; Label: Born & Bred; Formats: CD, LP, digital download	6	26	33	45	45	19	54	50	18	85	
Signed and Sealed in Blood	Released: January 8, 2013; Label: Born & Bred; Formats: CD, LP, digital download	9	23	9	30	22	5	—	65	4	88	
11 Short Stories of Pain & Glory	Released: January 6, 2017; Label: Born & Bred; Formats: CD, LP, digital download	8	15	4	22	—	3	—	36	24	68	
Turn Up That Dial	Released: April 30, 2021; Label: Born & Bred; Formats: CD, LP, digital download	74	92	9	44	—	4	—	51	55	—	
This Machine Still Kills Fascists	Released: September 30, 2022; Label: Dummy Luck; Formats: CD, LP, digital download, streaming	—	—	—	77	—	24	—	—	—	—	
Okemah Rising	Released: May 12, 2023; Label: Dummy Luck; Formats: CD, LP, digital download, streaming	—	—	—	—	—	19	—	—	—	—	
For the People	Released: July 4, 2025 (streaming), October 10, 2025 (CD/LP); Label: Dummy Luck; Formats: Streaming, CD, LP	—	89	29	—	—	14	—	—	—	—	
"—" denotes a recording that did not chart or was not released in that territory.

=== Live albums ===
List of live albums, with selected chart positions
Title	Album details	Peak chart positions								
Title	Album details	US	US Alt.	US Ind.	US Rock	BEL (FL)	BEL (WA)	CAN	NLD	SWE
Live on St. Patrick's Day	Released: September 10, 2002; Label: Hellcat; Formats: CD, LP	155	—	8	—	43	—	—	56	—
Live on Lansdowne, Boston MA	Released: March 16, 2010; Label: Born & Bred; Formats: CD, LP	25	6	2	8	89	91	59	—	38
Live at Fenway	Released: 2012; Label: Born & Bred; Formats: LP	—	—	—	—	—	—	—	—	—
"—" denotes a recording that did not chart or was not released in that territory.

=== Compilation and other albums ===
List of compilation albums, with selected chart positions
Title	Album details	Peak chart positions
Title	Album details	US Ind.
The Early Years	Released: 1998; Label: Sidekicks Records; Formats: CD, LP	—
Mob Mentality (split album with The Business	Released: 2000; Label: Taang!; Formats: CD, LP, Cassette	—
The Singles Collection, Volume 1	Released: May 23, 2000; Label: Hellcat; Formats: CD, LP	—
Singles Collection, Volume 2	Released: March 8, 2005; Label: Hellcat; Formats: CD, LP	26
"—" denotes releases that did not chart or were not released in that territory.

== Extended plays ==
List of extended plays, with selected chart positions
Title	EP details	Peak chart positions
Title	EP details	US Ind.
Boys on the Docks	Released: July 7, 1997; Label: Cyclone; Formats: CD	—
Tessie	Released: August 24, 2004; Label: Hellcat; Formats: CD, LP, digital download	22
Johnny, I Hardly Knew Ya	Released: 2008; Label: Unknown; Formats: CD	
Rose Tattoo: For Boston Charity EP	Released: May 15, 2013; Label: Born & Bred; Formats: Digital download	—
"—" denotes releases that did not chart or were not released in that territory.

== Split releases/other (7″, 10″, 12″) ==
List of extended plays, with selected chart positions
Title	EP details	Peak chart positions
Title	EP details	US Ind.
Dropkick Murphys / Ducky Boys (with The Ducky Boys)	Released: 1996; Label: Flat; Formats: 7"	—
TKO Records Presents: The 1998 Street Punk Title Bout (versus Anti-Heros)	Released: 1997; Label: TKO; Formats: 7"	—
Tattoos and Scally Caps	Released: February 1997; Label: GMM; Formats: 7"	—
Fire and Brimstone	Released: March 28, 1997; Label: Cyclone; Formats: 7"	—
The Bruisers/Dropkick Murphys Split 7 Inch (with The Bruisers)	Released: September 1997; Label: Pogostick; Formats: 7"	—
German Lager vs. Irish Stout (with Oxymoron)	Released: July 7, 1998; Label: Flat; Formats: 7"	—
Curse Of A Fallen Soul	Released: July 7, 1998; Label: Flat; Formats: 7"	—
Mob Mentality (with The Business)	Released: 1999; Label: Taang!; Formats: 7"	—
Unity (with Agnostic Front)	Released: December 1999; Label: Flat; Formats: 7"	—
Live on a Five	Released: 2000; Label: Headache; Formats: 5"	—
This Is the East Coast (...Not L.A.) (with H_{2}O)	Released: 2000; Formats: 10"	—
Back on the Streets (with A Poor Excuse, Slang and Tom and the Bootboys)	Released: August 1, 2000; Label: Formats: 10"	—
Face to Face vs. Dropkick Murphys (versus Face to Face)	Released: 2002; Label: Vagrant; Formats: CD	—
Back to the Hub	Released: 2003; Label: Bacon Sandwich; Formats: 7"	—
Fat City Presents...One For the Ages! (with The Vandals)	Released: 2003; Label: Fat City, Combat Zone; Formats: 7"	—
Time to Go (Boston Bruins promo)	Released: 2003; Label: n/a; Formats: CD	—
Fields of Athenry: Andrew Farrar Memorial	Released: 2005; Label: n/a; Formats: CD	—
Smash Shit Up	Released: January 31, 2020; Label: Born & Bred; Formats: 12", digital download	—
Christmas (Baby Please Come Home) / I Wish You Were Here	Released: November 24, 2020; Label: Born & Bred; Formats: 7", digital download	—
New England Forever (with Haywire)	Released: February 9, 2026 (12" vinyl tour exclusive), March 17, 2026 (digital download); Label: Dummy Luck Music; Formats: 12", digital download	—
"—" denotes releases that did not chart or were not released in that territory.

== Singles ==
List of singles, with selected chart positions and certifications, showing year released and album name
Title	Year	Peak chart positions										Certifications	Album
Title	Year	US Bub.	US Rock	AUS	CAN Rock	CZ Rock	FRA	IRL	SCO	SWI	UK	Certifications	Album
"10 Years of Service"	1999	—	—	—	—	—	—	—	—	—	—		The Gang's All Here
"Good Rats"	2000	—	—	—	—	—	—	—	—	—	—		Sing Loud, Sing Proud!
"The Wild Rover"	2002	—	—	—	—	—	—	—	—	—	—		Sing Loud, Sing Proud!
"Walk Away"	2003	—	—	—	—	—	—	—	97	—	84		Blackout
"The Dirty Glass"	2003	—	—	—	—	—	—	—	—	—	—		Blackout
"Fields of Athenry"	2004	—	—	—	—	—	—	—	76	—	85		Blackout
"Sunshine Highway"	2005	—	—	—	—	—	—	—	—	—	—		The Warrior's Code
"The Warrior's Code"	2005	—	—	—	—	—	—	—	—	—	—		The Warrior's Code
"I'm Shipping Up to Boston"	2006	1	— (Note: "I'm Shipping Up To Boston" did not enter the Hot Rock Songs chart, but peaked at number 12 on the Rock Digital Songs chart.)	—	—	3	174	54	—	45	—	RIAA: Platinum; BPI: Gold	The Warrior's Code
"The State of Massachusetts"	2008	1	14	—	—	—	—	—	—	—	—		The Meanest of Times
"Surrender"	2008	—	—	—	—	—	—	—	—	—	—		The Meanest of Times
"Johnny I Hardly Knew Ya"	2008	—	—	—	—	—	—	—	—	—	—		The Meanest of Times
"The Chosen Few"	2008	—	—	—	—	—	—	—	—	—	—		Non-album single
"Going Out in Style"	2011	—	— (Note: "Going Out In Style" did not enter the Hot Rock Songs chart, but peaked at number 33 on the Rock Digital Songs chart.)	—	—	19	—	—	—	—	—		Going Out in Style
"Memorial Day"	2011	—	—	—	—	—	—	—	—	—	—		Going Out in Style
"Sunday Hardcore Matinee"	2012	—	—	—	—	—	—	—	—	—	—		Live at Fenway
"Rose Tattoo"	2012	—	—	—	—	—	—	—	—	—	—		Signed and Sealed in Blood
"The Season's Upon Us"	2012	—	23	69	42	—	—	—	—	—	—		Signed and Sealed in Blood
"The Boys Are Back"	2012	—	—	—	—	9	—	—	—	—	—		Signed and Sealed in Blood
"Rose Tattoo" (featuring Bruce Springsteen)	2013	—	25	—	—	—	—	—	—	—	—		Rose Tattoo: For Boston Charity EP
"Out of Our Heads"	2013	—	—	—	—	—	—	—	—	—	—		Signed and Sealed in Blood
"Blood"	2016	—	—	—	—	—	—	—	—	—	—		11 Short Stories of Pain & Glory
"You'll Never Walk Alone"	2016	—	—	—	—	4	—	—	—	—	—		11 Short Stories of Pain & Glory
"Paying My Way"	2016	—	— (Note: "Paying My Way" did not enter the Hot Rock & Alternative Songs chart, but peaked at number 25 on the Alternative Digital Songs chart.)	—	—	—	—	—	—	—	—		11 Short Stories of Pain & Glory
"Smash Shit Up"	2020	—	—	—	—	5	—	—	—	—	—		Turn Up That Dial
"Mick Jones Nicked My Pudding" (Note: "Mick Jones Nicked My Pudding" was released as an exclusive digital single through the band's website. The single features the b-side "James Connolly". Fans could pay what they wanted from $2 up to a $50 option, that featured a video shout-out from the band, or to a $100 option that would feature a "Roast Your Buddy" video by the band.)	2020	—	—	—	—	18	—	—	—	—	—		Turn Up That Dial
"Middle Finger"	2021	—	—	—	—	—	—	—	—	—	—		Turn Up That Dial
"Queen of Suffolk County"	2021	—	—	—	—	8	—	—	—	—	—		Turn Up That Dial
"Good as Gold"	2021	—	—	—	—	10	—	—	—	—	—		Turn Up That Dial
"We Shall Overcome"	2022	—	—	—	—	12	—	—	—	—	—		Turn Up That Dial
"Two 6's Upside Down"	2022	—	—	—	—	—	—	—	—	—	—		This Machine Still Kills Fascists
"Ten Times More"	2022	—	—	—	—	—	—	—	—	—	—		This Machine Still Kills Fascists
"All You Fonies"	2022	—	—	—	—	—	—	—	—	—	—		This Machine Still Kills Fascists
"The Last One" (feat. Evan Felker)	2022	—	—	—	—	—	—	—	—	—	—		This Machine Still Kills Fascists
"Cadillac, Cadillac" (feat. Sammy Amara of Broilers)	2023	—	—	—	—	—	—	—	—	—	—		This Machine Still Kills Fascists
"Never Git Drunk No More" (feat. Nikki Lane)	2023	—	—	—	—	—	—	—	—	—	—		This Machine Still Kills Fascists
"I Know How it Feels"	2023	—	—	—	—	—	—	—	—	—	—		Okemah Rising
"Gotta Get to Peeskill" (feat. Violent Femmes)	2023	—	—	—	—	—	—	—	—	—	—		Okemah Rising
"Bring It Home" (feat. Jaime Wyatt)	2023	—	—	—	—	—	—	—	—	—	—		Okemah Rising
"Sirens"	2024	—	—	—	—	—	—	—	—	—	—		For the People
"Who'll Stand With Us?"	2025	—	—	—	—	—	—	—	—	—	—		For the People
"Chesterfields and Aftershave"	2025	—	—	—	—	—	—	—	—	—	—		For the People
"A Hero Among Many"	2025	—	—	—	—	—	—	—	—	—	—		For the People
"The Big Man"	2026	—	—	—	—	—	—	—	—	—	—		For the People
"Citizen I.C.E." (Dropkick Murphys feat. Haywire)	2026	—	—	—	—	—	—	—	—	—	—		New England Forever
"New England Forever" (Haywire feat. Dropkick Murphys)	2026	—	—	—	—	—	—	—	—	—	—		New England Forever
"Only the Strong"	2026	—	—	—	—	—	—	—	—	—	—		New England Forever
"The Body of an American"	2026	—	—	—	—	—	—	—	—	—	—		20th Century Paddy - The Songs of Shane MacGowan
"Dropped on My Head"	2026	—	—	—	—	—	—	—	—	—	—		For the People
"—" denotes a recording that did not chart or was not released in that territory.

== Other charted songs ==
Title	Year	Peak chart positions	Album
Title	Year	CZ Rock	Album
"Turn Up That Dial"	2021	3	Turn Up That Dial

== Other appearances ==
- I've Got My Friends-Boston/San Francisco Split CD (1996) – Includes "Get Up" and "Skinhead On The MBTA" (original version).
- Runt of the Litter, Vol. 2 (1996) – Includes "In The Streets of Boston (live June 29, 1996 @ TT the Bears)"
- Oi! Skampilation Vol. 3 (1997) – Includes "Road of the Righteous" and "3rd Man In" (both live)
- Give 'Em the Boot (1997) – Includes "Barroom Hero (original version)"
- Vans Off the Wall Sampler (1998) – Includes "Road of the Righteous"
- Give 'Em the Boot II (1999) – Includes "The Gang's All Here"
- Vans Off the Wall Sampler (1999) – Includes "Boston Asphalt"
- Punk Rock Jukebox Vol. 3 (1999) – Includes "Vengeance"
- Built for Speed – A Motorhead Tribute (1999) – Includes "Rock and Roll"
- Punch Drunk (1999) – Includes "You're a Rebel"
- Boston Drops The Gloves: A Tribute to Slapshot (1999) – Includes "I've Had Enough"
- The Sopranos (1999) - Uses "Cadence to Arms" in an episode
- Punch Drunk Vol. 2 (2000) – Includes "Soundtrack to a Killing Spree"
- A Worldwide Tribute to Oi (2000) – Includes "Hey Little Rich Boy" and "Never Again"
- Back on the Streets – Japanese/American Punk Unity (2000) – Includes "Halloween" and "Soundtrack to a Killing Spree"
- Dave Mirra Freestyle BMX (2000) – Uses "Never Alone" on video game soundtrack
- Punk-O-Rama Vol. 5 (2000) – Includes "Good Rats (original version)"
- Punk-O-Rama Vol. 6 (2001) – Includes "The Gauntlet"
- A Tribute to Cock Sparrer (2001) – Includes "Working"
- Late Night with Conan O’Brien (2001) - Band performance of "The Spicy McHaggis Jig" (features a man dressed as a leprechaun dancing on stage with the band)
- Give 'Em the Boot III (2002) – Includes "The Legend of Finn McCummhail"
- Punk-O-Rama Vol. 7 (2002) – Includes "Heroes from Our Past"
- Atticus: Dragging the Lake, Vol. 2 (2003) – Includes "Fields of Athenry"
- Punk-O-Rama Vol. 8 (2003) – Includes "Gonna Be a Blackout Tonight"
- 2003 Warped Tour Compilation (2003) – Includes "Walk Away"
- The O.C. (2003) - Uses "Walk Away" in an episode
- Backyard Wrestling: Don't Try This at Home (2003) - Uses "This is Your Life" on video game soundtrack
- Late Night with Conan O'Brien (2003) - Band performance of "Walk Away"
- Tony Hawk's Underground soundtrack (2003) – Includes "Time To Go"
- Give 'Em the Boot IV (2004) – Includes "I'm Shipping Up to Boston (original version)"
- Rock Against Bush, Vol. 2 (2004) – Includes "We Got the Power"
- Punk-O-Rama Vol. 9 (2004) – Includes "The Dirty Glass" (Blackout version)
- Punk-O-Rama Vol. 10 (2005) – Includes "The Warrior's Code"
- MVP Baseball 2005 soundtrack (2005) – Includes "Tessie"
- Fever Pitch soundtrack (2005) – Includes "Tessie"
- Tony Hawk's American Wasteland soundtrack (2005) – Includes "Who is Who"
- 2005 Warped Tour Compilation (2005) – Includes "Sunshine Highway"
- The Shield (2005) – Uses "Amazing Grace" in an episode
- Jimmy Kimmel Live (2005) – Band performance of "The Dirty Glass"
- Give 'Em the Boot V (2006) – Includes "Warriors Code"
- Whiskey in the Jar: Essential Irish Drinking Songs and Sing Alongs (2006) – Includes "Fields of Athenry", "The Wild Rover", and "The Dirty Glass" (Blackout version)
- The Departed soundtrack (2006) – Includes "I'm Shipping Up to Boston"
- Late Night with David Letterman (2006) – Band performance of "I'm Shipping Up to Boston"
- Give 'Em the Boot VI (2007) – Includes "Citizen C.I.A."
- Lobster Wars (2007) – Uses "I'm Shipping Up to Boston" as its theme song
- The Simpsons (2008) – Uses "I'm Shipping Up to Boston" in an episode
- Sons of Anarchy (2008) – Uses "Johnny I Hardly Knew Ya" in an episode
- Late Show with David Letterman (2008) – Band performance of "The State of Massachusetts"
- Monkfish (2008) – Band appearance
- Let Them Know: The Story of Youth Brigade and BYO Records (2009) – "Fight To Unite"
- The Green Fields of France (short film) (2009) – Uses "The Green Fields of France" in the film
- Nitro Circus (2009) – Uses "The State of Massachusetts" in two episodes
- Late Late Show with Craig Ferguson (2009) – Band performance of "(F)lannigan's Ball"
- Untitled 21: A Juvenile Tribute to the Swingin' Utters (2010) – "Strongman"
- The Fighter (2010) – Uses "The Warrior's Code" in the film
- NHL 11 soundtrack (2010) – Includes "I'm Shipping up to Boston (Live)"
- Restrepo (2010) – Uses "Barroom Hero" in the movie's credits
- 2010 NHL Winter Classic (2010) – Band performance of "I'm Shipping Up to Boston"
- Conan (2011) – Band performance of "Going Out in Style"
- NHL 12 soundtrack (2011) – Includes "Hang 'Em High"
- Big Evening Buzz (2012) – Band performance
- Battleship (2012) – Uses "Hang 'Em High" in the film
- Drink 'Em Dry (documentary) (2012) – Uses "Boys on the Docks" in the film
- Respect Your Roots Worldwide (2012) – Includes "Badlands"
- VH1's Big Morning Buzz (2012) – Band performance of "The Season's Upon Us"
- Today (2013) – Band performance of "Rose Tattoo" (minus Barr and Wallace)
- Boston's Finest (2013) – Uses "Out of Our Heads" as the theme song for the Boston-based police reality show
- Late Night With David Letterman (2013) – Band performance of "Out of Our Heads"
- Captain Morgan (2013) – "The Prisoner's Song" appears in commercial for the Rum
- Conan (2013) – Band performance of "The Prisoner's Song"
- NHL 14 (2013) – Includes "The Boys Are Back"
- Patriots Day (2016) - Uses "Forever (2007 version)" during the film's closing credits
- The Walking Dead (2017) - Uses "Prisoner's Song" in the season 8 Comic-Con trailer
- NHL 22 (2021) - Includes "Good as Gold"
- 20th Century Paddy - The Songs of Shane MacGowan (2026) - The band covers the Pogues song "The Body of an American"
- The Westies (2026) - "Dropped on My Head", a bonus track from For the People, serves as the official theme song for the MGM+ series

== Video albums and documentaries ==
List of video albums
Title	Album details
On the Road with the Dropkick Murphys	Released: March 9, 2004; Label: Epitaph, WEA; Formats: DVD
Give 'Em the Boot	Released: October 31, 2005; Label: Epitaph, WEA; Formats: DVD
This Machine Rising	Released: August 30, 2024; Label: Formats: YouTube

== Music videos ==
List of music videos, showing year released and director
Title	Year	Director(s)
"Barroom Hero"	1998	—N/a
"10 Years of Service"	1999	—N/a
"The Gauntlet"	2001	—N/a
"The Spicy McHaggis Jig"	2001	—N/a
"The Wild Rover"	2002	Mark Higgins
"Gonna Be a Blackout Tonight"	2003	Mark Higgins
"Walk Away"	2003	Zachary Merck
"Tessie"	2004	—N/a
"Sunshine Highway"	2005	Zachary Merck
"The Warrior's Code"	2005	—N/a
"I'm Shipping Up to Boston"	2006	Mark Higgins
"The State of Massachusetts"	2007	Marc Colucci
"(F)lannigan's Ball (Meanest of Times DVD)"	2007	—N/a
"Johnny, I hardly knew Ya (Meanest of Times DVD Version)"	2007	—N/a
"The Wild Rover (Charity Breakfast)"	2007	—N/a
"Forever (Charity Breakfast)"	2007	—N/a
"Boys on the Docks (Charity Breakfast)"	2007	—N/a
"Tomorrow's Industry"	2008	—N/a
"Johnny, I Hardly Knew Ya"	2008	Mark Higgins
"I’m Shipping Up to Boston (The Departed Version)"	2008	—N/a
"The State of Massachusetts (live)"	2009	—N/a
"I'm Shipping Up to Boston" (live)	2010	Torey Champagne
"Going Out in Style"	2011	Mark Higgins
"Memorial Day"	2011	Michael Gill
"Rose Tattoo"	2012	Chris Friend / Vision Friend
"The Season's Upon Us"	2012	Garrett Warren
"The Boys Are Back"	2013	Mark Higgins
"Out of Our Heads"	2013	Gregory Nolan
"Blood"	2016	Chris Curtis
"Paying My Way"	2017	Chris Curtis
"Until the Next Time"	2017	Gregory Nolan
"Smash Shit Up"	2020	Chris Friend / Vision Friend
"Mick Jones Nicked My Pudding"	2020	Kes Glozier, Adam Murphy
"I Wish You Were Here"	2020	Oliver Riley-Smith
"Middle Finger"	2021	Kes Glozier
"Queen of Suffolk County"	2021	Mark Higgins
"L-EE-B-O-Y"	2021	Adam Murphy
"H.B.D.M.F."	2021	Dave Stauble, Tim Dennesen
"Good as Gold"	2021	Dave Stauble
"We Shall Overcome"	2022	Shawn Howard
"We Shall Overcome" (Ukrainian Version) (featuring O'Hamsters)	2022	—N/a
"Two 6's Upside Down"	2022	Dave Stauble
"Ten Times More"	2022	Dave Stauble
"All You Fonies"	2022	Dave Stauble
"The Last One" (featuring Evan Felker)	2022	Dave Stauble
"Cadillac, Cadillac" (featuring Sammy Amara of Broilers)	2023	Mike Rivkees
"Never Git Drunk No More" (featuring Nikki Lane)	2023	Mike Rivkees
"All You Tories"	2023	Shawn Howard
"I Know How it Feels"	2023	—N/a
"Gotta Get to Peekskill" (featuring Violent Femmes)	2023	Shawn Howard
"Bring It Home" (featuring Jaime Wyatt)	2023	Nir Ben Jacob
"Sirens"	2024	Travis Schneider
"Who'll Stand With Us?"	2025	Jon Vulpine
"Chesterfields and Aftershave"	2025	Jon Vulpine
"A Hero Among Many"	2025	Dark Details, Dave Stauble
"The Big Man"	2026	Adam Murphy, Brad Strickman
"Citizen I.C.E. (feat. Haywire)"	2026	Dave Stauble
"Only the Strong"	2026	Dave Stauble
"The Body of an American"	2026	Anna Sherlock, Ken Casey
"Dropped on My Head"	2026	Dave Stauble

=== Tributes ===
- Ex-USSR Tribute to Dropkick Murphys
- Famous For Nothing: A Tribute To Dropkick Murphys
