= Live on St. Patrick's Day from Boston, MA =

Live album by Dropkick Murphys
- Released: September 10, 2002
- Recorded: March 15 – 17, 2002
- Genres: Celtic punk; punk rock; Oi!; hardcore punk; street punk
- Length: 74:17
- Label: Hellcat Records
- Producer: Paul Kolderie

Dropkick Murphys chronology
Sing Loud, Sing Proud (2001)	Live on St. Patrick's Day from Boston, MA (2002)	Blackout (2003)

Professional ratings
Review scores
Source	Rating
Allmusic	4.5/5 stars

Live on St. Patrick's Day from Boston, MA is a live album from Boston punk band Dropkick Murphys. It was recorded over three shows at the Avalon Ballroom in, as the name implies, Boston, Massachusetts, and was released on September 10, 2002.

== Track list ==
No.	Title	Length
1.	"Intro" (T.J. Hurley)	0:57
2.	"For Boston"	1:27
3.	"Boys on the Docks"	2:26
4.	"Road of the Righteous"	2:38
5.	"Upstarts & Broken Hearts"	2:49
6.	"The Gauntlet"	2:57
7.	"Rocky Road to Dublin" (Traditional)	2:36
8.	"Heroes From Our Past"	3:50
9.	"Finnegan's Wake" (Traditional)	2:15
10.	"Which Side Are You On?" (Florence Reece (not featured on dvd))	2:31
11.	"A Few Good Men"	3:12
12.	"Curse Of A Fallen Soul"	3:16
13.	"The Torch"	3:48
14.	"The Gang's All Here"	4:52
15.	"Forever"	3:35
16.	"The Spicy McHaggis Jig"	3:23
17.	"John Law"	1:30
18.	"Wild Rover" (Traditional)	3:24
19.	"Fortunate Son" (John Fogerty – Creedence Clearwater Revival cover)	3:23
20.	"Nutty" (Bruin's Theme)	1:38
21.	"Good Rats"	4:10
22.	"Amazing Grace" (John Newton)	2:28
23.	"Alcohol" (Gang Green)	1:54
24.	"Barroom Hero"	2:43
25.	"Dirty Water" (Ed Cobb)	3:20
26.	"Bloody Pig Pile" (Skinhead on the MBTA)	3:15

== Personnel ==
Dropkick Murphys:

- Al Barr – vocals
- Ken Casey – bass guitar, vocals
- Matt Kelly – drums
- James Lynch – guitar, vocals
- Marc Orrell – guitar, accordion, vocals
- Ryan Foltz – mandolin, tin whistle, vocals
- Spicy McHaggis – bagpipes
