= Singles Collection, Volume 2 =

Compilation album by Dropkick Murphys
- Released: March 8, 2005
- Recorded: 1998–2004
- Genre: Punk
- Length: 55:53
- Label: Hellcat Records

Dropkick Murphys chronology
Tessie (2004)	Singles Collection, Volume 2 (2005)	The Warrior's Code (2005)

Singles Collection chronology
The Singles Collection, Volume 1 (2000)	Singles Collection, Volume 2 (2005)

Professional ratings
Review scores
Source	Rating
Allmusic	link

Singles Collection Volume 2 is a b-side and rarities compilation album released by Boston punk rock band Dropkick Murphys, on March 8, 2005. The album, which peaked at No. 26 and spent three weeks on the chart, contains songs released on singles, compilations and splits. Among the songs, two are alternate versions of songs previously released on Dropkick Murphys albums, five songs were written by the band (one of which was co-written with The Business) and the rest were covers. The artists covered range from mainstream rock bands such as AC/DC and Creedence Clearwater Revival to influential punk bands such as Sham 69 and Cock Sparrer.

"We Got the Power", a song about the 1919 Boston Police Strike also appeared on Fat Wreck Chords's 2004 compilation album Rock Against Bush, Vol. 2.

== Song information ==
Song	Recorded	Originally appeared on	Notes
"21 Guitar Salute"	2002	Face to Face vs. Dropkick Murphys Split EP	Originally performed by The Press
"Fortunate Son"	2002	Face to Face vs. Dropkick Murphys Split EP	Originally performed by Creedence Clearwater Revival
"On the Attack"	1998	Curse of Fallen Soul 7"	
"You're a Rebel"	1998	Curse of Fallen Soul 7"	Originally performed by Iron Cross
"Watch Your Back"	1998	Irish Stout vs German Lager Split 7"	Originally performed by Cock Sparrer
"Vengeance"	1999	Punk Rock Jukebox Volume II	Originally performed by The Nipple Erectors
"It's a Long Way to the Top (If You Wanna Rock 'n' Roll)"	2003	Blackout 10" vinyl release	Originally performed by AC/DC
"Warlords"	2001	Sing Loud, Sing Proud! Japanese CD bonus track	Originally performed by The F.U.'s
"Alcohol"	2003	Back to the Hub 7"	Originally performed by Gang Green
"Pipebomb on Lansdowne (Dance Remix)"	1999	Unity Split 7"	Alternate version of a song that originally appeared on The Gang's All Here
"Nobody's Hero"	1999	Unity Split 7"	Originally performed by Stiff Little Fingers
"Mob Mentality"	2000	Mob Mentality Split 7"	Performed with The Business, known as the 7" version on the Mob Mentality CD
"Informer"	2000	Mob Mentality Split 7"	Originally performed by The Business
"The Nutrocker (Nutty)"	2004	Tessie EP	A cover of a song considered to be the Boston Bruins theme
"Rock 'n' Roll"	1999	Built for Speed - A Motörhead Tribute	Originally performed by Motörhead
"Hey Little Rich Boy"	2000	The Worldwide Tribute to the Real Oi	Originally performed by Sham 69
"Never Again"	2000	The Worldwide Tribute to the Real Oi	Originally performed by Angelic Upstarts
"Halloween"	2000	Back on the Streets - Japanese/American Punk Unity	Originally performed by Misfits
"Soundtrack to a Killing Spree"	2000	Back on the Streets - Japanese/American Punk Unity	
"Wild Rover"	2000	Sing Loud, Sing Proud! vinyl release	Alternate version of the one that was on the Sing Loud, Sing Proud! CD, featuring Shane MacGowan
"Working"	2000	A Tribute to Cock Sparrer	Originally performed by Cock Sparrer
"Victory"	2003	Walk Away single	Cover of "Notre Dame Victory March"
"We Got the Power"	2003	Walk Away single	Outtake from Blackout recording sessions

== Track listing ==
1. "21 Guitar Salute" (Andre Schlesinger) – 2:40
2. "Fortunate Son" (John Fogerty) – 2:38
3. "On the Attack" (Dropkick Murphys) – 1:26
4. "You're a Rebel" (Iron Cross) – 2:42
5. "Watch Your Back" (Mick Beaufoy, Steve Bruce, Steve Burgess, Colin McFaull) – 1:54
6. "Vengeance" (Shane MacGowan, K Bradley) – 2:38
7. "It's a Long Way to the Top (If You Wanna Rock 'n' Roll)" (Angus Young, Malcolm Young, Bon Scott) – 4:43
8. "Warlords" (The F.U.'s) – 2:23
9. "Alcohol" (Chris Doherty, Chuck Stilphen) – 1:54
10. "Pipebomb on Lansdowne (Dance Remix)" (Dropkick Murphys) – 2:00
11. "Nobody’s Hero" (Stiff Little Fingers, Gordon Ogilvie) – 3:42
12. "Mob Mentality" (Dropkick Murphys, The Business) – 2:18
13. "Informer" (The Business) – 1:56
14. "The Nutrocker (Instrumental) (Nutty)" (Kim Fowley) – 1:17
15. "Rock 'n' Roll" (Phil Campbell, Würzel, Lemmy, Phil Taylor) – 3:27
16. "Hey Little Rich Boy" (Sham 69) – 1:29
17. "Never Again" (Angelic Upstarts) – 2:52
18. "Halloween" (Glenn Danzig) – 1:34
19. "Soundtrack to a Killing Spree" (Dropkick Murphys) – 1:36
20. "Wild Rover" (Traditional, Dropkick Murphys) – 3:24
21. "Working" (Mick Beaufoy, Steve Bruce, Steve Burgess, Colin McFaull) – 2:38
22. "Victory" (Michael J. Shea) – 1:43
23. "We Got the Power" (Dropkick Murphys) – 2:46

== Personnel ==
- Al Barr – vocals
- Rick Barton – guitar
- James Lynch – guitar, vocals
- Marc Orrell – guitar, vocals
- Ken Casey – bass
- Matt Kelly – drums
- Joe Delaney – bagpipes on "21 Guitar Salute" and "Mob Mentality"
- Lars Frederiksen - guest vocals on "Vengeance"
- Dicky Barrett - guest vocals on "Rock 'n' Roll"
- Shane Macgowan - guest vocals on "The Wild Rover"
