= This Machine Still Kills Fascists =

Studio album by Dropkick Murphys
- Released: September 30, 2022
- Recorded: 2022
- Studio: The Church Studio (Tulsa, Oklahoma)
- Genre: Folk rock; Americana; acoustic rock
- Length: 30:17
- Label: Dummy Luck Music

Dropkick Murphys chronology
Turn Up That Dial (2021)	This Machine Still Kills Fascists (2022)	Okemah Rising (2023)

Singles from This Machine Still Kills Fascists
- 1. "Two 6's Upside Down" Released: July 6, 2022; 2. "Ten Times More" Released: August 22, 2022; 3. "All You Fonies" Released: September 14, 2022; 4. "The Last One (featuring Evan Felker)" Released: September 30, 2022; 5. "Cadillac, Cadillac (featuring Sammy Amara of Broilers)" Released: January 10, 2023; 6. "Never Git Drunk No More (featuring Nikki Lane)" Released: February 10, 2023

This Machine Still Kills Fascists is the eleventh studio album by American band Dropkick Murphys and was released on September 30, 2022, on Dummy Luck Music. It marks the band's first studio album since Do or Die to not feature vocalist Al Barr, who was on hiatus from the band to take care of his ailing mother. It is the band's first acoustic album and is composed of unused lyrics and words by Woody Guthrie.

== Background ==
The album was recorded in Tulsa in Woody Guthrie's home state of Oklahoma at Leon Russell's The Church Studio. With Al Barr on hiatus from the band, the band thought it was the ideal time to record an acoustic album. The band had previously put some of Guthrie's lyrics to music, most notably 2005's "I'm Shipping Up to Boston" which became the band's biggest charting single. Guthrie's daughter, Nora, reached out to the band after she collected various lyrics composed by her father that she thought was fitting for the band to possibly record. According to guitarist James Lynch, the band was invited by Nora to go through her father's archives and select lyrics to use.

The title of the album comes from "This machine kills fascists", a slogan that Guthrie used to write on his guitars.

By using Guthrie's guitar phrase for their album title, [Ken] Casey said in an WBUR interview the band wanted to show that Guthrie's music remains relevant today. What confuses Casey, though, is how the word fascism still triggers some people.

In an interview, Casey said "...that movement didn't end with Trump. He set a model that others will now follow. It's authoritarianism and fascism 101; the press is the enemy of the people, turn people against each other."

== Promotion ==
The album was preceded by the singles and music videos for "Two 6's Upside Down" on July 6, 2022, "Ten Times More" on August 22, 2022, and "All You Fonies" on September 14, 2022, "The Last One" (featuring Evan Felker) was released as the album's fourth single and music video on September 30, 2022. The album's fifth single and music video for "Cadillac, Cadillac" (featuring Sammy Amara of Broilers) was released on January 10, 2023. The song was featured as a bonus track on the expanded edition of the album. "Never Git Drunk Again" (featuring Nikki Lane) was released as the album's sixth and final single and music video on February 10, 2023.

In February 2023, the band released a music video for the song "All You Tories" which was a re-working of "All You Fonies". "In support of all our Union friends in the UK fighting the good fight against the elitist Tory political party we made this music video in association with the RMT (The National Union of Rail, Maritime and Transport Workers). On our recent UK shows we changed the words to the song "All You Fonies (Bound To Lose)" to "All You Tories" in support of the striking railroad and transit workers, nurses, fire fighters, teachers, postal workers, ambulance staff and health workers. Yours in Solidarity, Dropkick Murphys" the band said in a statement that was released with the video.

The band embarked on the This Machine...Tour in support of the album, which was the band's first acoustic theater tour. It began in late October 2022 and concluded in late November 2022.

== This Machine Rising documentary ==
On August 30, 2024, the band will release the short documentary, This Machine Rising, on YouTube. The film "tells the story of Dropkick Murphys' journey with Woody Guthrie's lyrics, focusing on the Tulsa sessions (the recording of This Machine Still Kills Fascists and Okemah Rising), the theater tour, and the enduring power of music and words to unite the working class and promote equity.

== Track listing ==
All lyrics by Woody Guthrie; all music by The Dropkick Murphys except "Dig a Hole" music by Woody Guthrie

This Machine Still Kills Fascists track listing
No.	Title	Length
1.	"Two 6's Upside Down"	3:29
2.	"Talking Jukebox"	3:13
3.	"Ten Times More"	2:11
4.	"Never Git Drunk No More" (featuring Nikki Lane)	3:25
5.	"All You Fonies"	2:49
6.	"The Last One" (featuring Evan Felker)	3:33
7.	"Cadillac, Cadillac"	2:53
8.	"Waters Are A'Risin"	3:02
9.	"Where Trouble Is At"	2:33
10.	"Dig a Hole" (featuring Woody Guthrie)	3:09
Total length:		30:17

Vinyl edition bonus track
No.	Title	Length
11.	"Never Git Drunk No More" (alternate version)

Expanded edition bonus tracks
No.	Title	Length
11.	"The Last One (Live at Ryman Auditorium)"	3:42
12.	"Never Git Drunk No More (Live at Ryman Auditorium)" (featuring Jaime Wyatt)	3:18
13.	"Where Trouble Is At (Live at Ryman Auditorium)"	3:13
14.	"Cadillac, Cadillac" (featuring Sammy Amara of Broilers)	2:53

== Personnel ==
Dropkick Murphys

- Tim Brennan – guitar, vocals
- Ken Casey – lead vocals
- Jeff DaRosa – banjo, mandolin, acoustic guitars, vocals
- Matt Kelly – drums, percussion, vocals
- James Lynch – guitars, vocals
- Kevin Rheault - bass

== Charts ==
Chart performance for This Machine Still Kills Fascists
Chart (2022)	Peak position
Australian Digital Albums (ARIA)	17
Belgian Albums (Ultratop Flanders)	77
Belgian Albums (Ultratop Wallonia)	163
German Albums (Offizielle Top 100)	24
Scottish Albums (OCC)	42
Swiss Albums (Schweizer Hitparade)	36
UK Album Downloads (OCC)	39
UK Independent Albums (OCC)	25
