= The Departed =

2006 film by Martin Scorsese

- Theatrical release poster
- Directed by: Martin Scorsese
- Screenplay by: William Monahan
- Based on: Infernal Affairs by: Alan Mak; Felix Chong
- Produced by: Brad Pitt; Brad Grey; Graham King
- Starring: Leonardo DiCaprio; Matt Damon; Jack Nicholson; Mark Wahlberg; Martin Sheen; Ray Winstone; Vera Farmiga; Alec Baldwin
- Cinematography: Michael Ballhaus
- Edited by: Thelma Schoonmaker
- Music by: Howard Shore
- Production companies: Plan B Entertainment; Initial Entertainment Group; Vertigo Entertainment; Media Asia Films
- Distributed by: Warner Bros. Pictures (United States); Media Asia Distribution (Hong Kong)
- Release dates: September 26, 2006 (Ziegfeld Theatre); October 6, 2006 (United States)
- Running time: 151 minutes
- Countries: United States; Hong Kong
- Language: English
- Budget: $90 million
- Box office: $291.5 million

The Departed is a 2006 neo-noir crime thriller film, directed by Martin Scorsese and written by William Monahan. A remake of the 2002 Hong Kong film Infernal Affairs, it is also loosely based on real-life people, including the Winter Hill Gang, corrupt FBI agent John Connolly and Irish-American crime boss Whitey Bulger. The film is set primarily in South Boston; Irish Mob boss Frank Costello (Jack Nicholson) plants Colin Sullivan (Matt Damon) as a spy within the Massachusetts State Police; simultaneously, the police assign undercover state trooper Billy Costigan (Leonardo DiCaprio) to infiltrate Costello's mob crew. The ensemble cast also features Mark Wahlberg, Martin Sheen, Ray Winstone, Vera Farmiga, Alec Baldwin, Anthony Anderson and James Badge Dale.

The Departed premiered at the Ziegfeld Theatre on September 26, 2006, and was released on October 6 by Warner Bros. Pictures in the United States. A critical and commercial success, the film grossed $291.5 million on a $90 million budget, and received acclaim for its direction, performances (particularly of DiCaprio, Nicholson and Wahlberg), screenplay and editing. At the 79th Academy Awards, The Departed won Best Picture, Best Director for Scorsese (his only ever personal Oscar win), Best Adapted Screenplay for Monahan, and Best Editing for Thelma Schoonmaker. It also received six nominations each at the 64th Golden Globe Awards (winning one) and the 60th British Academy Film Awards, and two nominations at the 13th Screen Actors Guild Awards.

== Plot ==
Colin Sullivan, first introduced to Boston Irish mob boss Frank Costello in the 1980s, has been groomed for years as Costello's spy inside the Massachusetts State Police (MSP). Sullivan is assigned to the Special Investigation Unit, where Captain Queenan and Sergeant Dignam assign another police academy recruit, Billy Costigan, to infiltrate Costello's organization.

Costigan, serving a prison term as cover, draws Costello's attention by committing several crimes and is recruited into Costello's gang. Costigan's mental health declines from increasing involvement in Costello's violent criminal activities, but Queenan and Dignam convince him to remain undercover. Sullivan begins dating police psychiatrist Madolyn Madden, who becomes Costigan's court-ordered therapist.

Costigan notifies the MSP that Costello will be selling stolen microprocessors to Chinese mobsters. When Sullivan helps thwart the attempted sting operation, Costello and the MSP realize they've been compromised. Costigan and Sullivan are each tasked to find the opposing mole. Costigan and Queenan learn that Costello is a protected FBI informant. Costigan begins an affair with Madden.

Costigan follows Costello and sees him pass Sullivan information on his crew. Costigan is unable to identify Sullivan, who realizes he is being followed and mistakenly stabs a passerby before fleeing. Lying to his fellow officers to have Queenan followed, Sullivan realizes Queenan is meeting with his mole and informs Costello's gang.

Costigan, fearing discovery as the mole, meets with Queenan to abort the operation. Queenan helps Costigan escape, but Costello's men arrive and throw Queenan from the building to his death. Fatally wounded in the ensuing firefight with police, Costello's henchman Timothy Delahunt tells Costigan that he knows he's the mole before dying.

Following Queenan's murder, Dignam is suspended after confronting Sullivan about cooperating with the FBI. A news report identifies Delahunt as a Boston Police Department undercover officer, but Costello suspects it's a ruse to protect the real mole. Sullivan directs the MSP to tail Costello, resulting in a gunfight that kills most of Costello's crew. Sullivan confronts a wounded Costello, who admits to being an informant before Sullivan kills him.

His assignment finished, Costigan reveals himself to Sullivan but recognizes Costello's envelope on his desk and deduces that Sullivan is Costello's mole. Costigan flees, and Sullivan realizes he has discovered the truth. Sullivan deletes Costigan's police records. Costigan leaves an envelope of evidence with Madden, who finds a recording of Sullivan's incriminating conversations with Costello.

Meeting Sullivan on the rooftop where Queenan was killed, Costigan arrests him. Trooper Brown, Costigan's police academy classmate, arrives as Costigan holds Sullivan at gunpoint, declaring he has evidence tying Sullivan to Costello. Taking the elevator to the lobby, Costigan is shot and killed by Trooper Barrigan, who reveals he is another of Costello's spies in the MSP. Brown is shot by Barrigan, who is then shot by Sullivan, framing Barrigan as Costello's only mole.

Sullivan recommends Costigan for posthumous commendation, but after Costigan's funeral, a pregnant Madden leaves him. He arrives home to find Dignam, who shoots him in the head and departs.

== Cast ==
- Leonardo DiCaprio as Trooper William "Billy" Costigan Jr.
- Matt Damon as Staff Sergeant Colin Sullivan
- Jack Nicholson as Francis "Frank" Costello
- Mark Wahlberg as Staff Sergeant Sean Dignam
- Martin Sheen as Captain Oliver "Charlie" Queenan
- Ray Winstone as Arnold "Frenchie" French
- Vera Farmiga as Dr. Madolyn Madden
- Alec Baldwin as Captain George Ellerby
- Anthony Anderson as Trooper Brown
- Kevin Corrigan as Sean Costigan
- James Badge Dale as Trooper Barrigan
- David O'Hara as Patrick "Fitzy" Fitzgibbons
- Mark Rolston as Timothy Delahunt
- Robert Wahlberg as FBI Special Agent Frank Lazio
- Amanda Lynch as Carmen
- Kristen Dalton as Gwen
- Shay Duffin as Phil

== Production ==
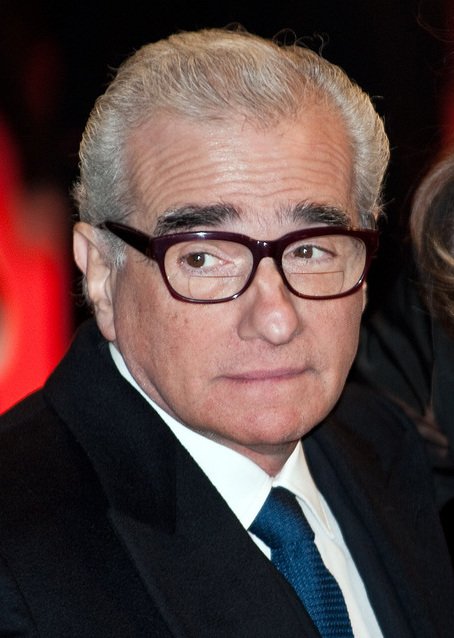
Martin Scorsese directed the film.

In January 2003, Warner Bros. Pictures, and producers Brad Grey and Brad Pitt bought the rights to remake the Hong Kong film Infernal Affairs (2002) from Media Asia Entertainment Group for $1.75 million. William Monahan was secured as a screenwriter, and Martin Scorsese, who admired Monahan's script, was signed as director.

In March 2004, United Press International announced Scorsese would be remaking Infernal Affairs and setting it in Boston, and that Leonardo DiCaprio and Brad Pitt were slated to star. Pitt, tentatively scheduled to play Sullivan, declined the role, saying a younger actor should play the part; he decided to produce the film instead. Scorsese's associate Kenneth Lonergan suggested Matt Damon, who grew up in Boston, for the part of Sullivan, and Scorsese asked Jack Nicholson to play Costello. Robert De Niro was approached to play Queenan, but De Niro declined in order to direct The Good Shepherd. Scorsese would say that De Niro turned down the role because he was not interested. Ray Liotta was approached for a role in the film, but declined due to a commitment to another project.

Nicholson wanted the film to have "something a little more" than the usual gangster film, and screenwriter Monahan came up with the idea of basing the Costello character on Irish-American gangster Whitey Bulger. This gave the screenplay an element of realism and an element of dangerous uncertainty because of the wide-ranging carte blanche the FBI gave Bulger in exchange for revealing information about fellow gangsters. A technical consultant on the film was Tom Duffy, who had served three decades on the Boston Police Department, where some of his responsibilities involved working as an undercover detective investigating the Irish mob.

The Departed was officially greenlit by Warner Bros. in early 2005, and shooting began on April 18 of that year. Some of the film was shot on location in Boston. For budgetary and logistical reasons, many scenes, in particular, interiors, were shot in locations and on sets in New York City, which had tax incentives for filmmakers that Boston did not have at the time.

Warner Bros. Pictures acquired worldwide distribution rights to the film, excluding the U.K., Ireland, France, Belgium, Italy, the CIS, Hong Kong and Taiwan. IEG sold the film to Entertainment Film Distributors in the United Kingdom and Ireland, TFM Distribution in France, Medusa Distribuzione in Italy, Belga Films in Belgium, Central Partnership in Russia and Ukraine, Media Asia Distribution in Hong Kong and Long Shong in Taiwan.

== Themes and motifs ==
Film critic Stanley Kauffmann said for The Departed, Scorsese "was apparently concerned with the idea of identity, one of the ancient themes of drama, and how it affects one's actions, emotions, self-knowledge, even dreams". Kauffmann, however, did not find the theme conveyed with particular effectiveness in the film. Film critic Roger Ebert compared Costigan's and Sullivan's seeking of approval from those they are deceiving to Stockholm syndrome. Ebert also noted the themes of Catholic guilt.

In the final scene, a rat is seen on Sullivan's window ledge. Scorsese acknowledges that, although it is not meant to be taken literally, it somewhat symbolizes the "quest for the rat" in the film and the strong sense of distrust among the characters, much like post-9/11 U.S. The window view behind the rat is a nod to gangster films like Little Caesar (1931), Scarface (1932) and White Heat (1949). The film's penultimate scene at Costigan's funeral when Madden walks past Sullivan and out of camera without looking at him is a visual quotation of the closing scene from The Third Man.

Throughout the film, Scorsese uses an "X" motif to foreshadow death in a manner similar to Howard Hawks's film Scarface (1932). Examples include shots of cross-beam supports in an airport walkway when Costigan is phoning Sgt. Dignam; the lighted "X" on the wall in Sullivan's office when he assures Costello over the phone that Costigan is not the rat; the taped windows of the building Queenan enters before being thrown to his death; behind Costigan's head in the elevator before he is shot; and the carpeted hallway floor when Sullivan returns to his apartment before being shot by Dignam.

== Reception ==
=== Box office ===
The Departed grossed $132.4 million in the United States and Canada, and $159 million in other territories for a total gross of $291.5 million, against a production budget of $90 million.

The film grossed $26.9 million in its opening weekend, becoming the fourth Martin Scorsese film to debut at number one. It is the latest Best Picture winner to debut atop the box office. In the following three weeks, the film grossed $19 million, $13.5 million and $9.8 million, finishing second at the box office each time before grossing $7.7 million and dropping to 5th in its fifth week.

=== Critical response ===
As per the review aggregator website Rotten Tomatoes, 91% of critics have given The Departed a positive review, based on 285 reviews, with an average rating of 8.40/10. The site's critics consensus reads: "Featuring outstanding work from an excellent cast, The Departed is a thoroughly engrossing gangster drama with the gritty authenticity and soupy morality we have come to expect from Martin Scorsese." On Metacritic, the film has a weighted average score of 85 out of 100, with 92% positive reviews based on 39 critics, indicating "universal acclaim". Audiences polled by CinemaScore gave the film an average grade of "A−" on a scale of A+ to F.

Entertainment Weekly ranked it on its end-of-the-decade "Best of" list, saying, "If they're lucky, directors make one classic film in their career. Martin Scorsese has one per decade (Taxi Driver in the '70s, Raging Bull in the '80s, Goodfellas in the '90s). His 2006 Irish Mafia masterpiece kept the streak alive."

Roger Ebert of the Chicago Sun-Times gave the film four stars out of four, praising Scorsese for thematically differentiating his film from the original.

Online critic James Berardinelli awarded the film four stars out of four, praising it as "an American epic tragedy". He claimed the film deserves to be ranked alongside Scorsese's successes, including Taxi Driver, Raging Bull and Goodfellas.

Andrew Lau, co-director of Infernal Affairs, in an interview with Hong Kong newspaper Apple Daily, said, "Of course I think the version I made is better, but the Hollywood version is pretty good too. [Scorsese] made the Hollywood version more attuned to American culture."

Andy Lau, one of the main actors in Infernal Affairs, when asked how the movie compares to the original, said, "The Departed was too long and it felt as if Hollywood had combined all three Infernal Affairs movies together." Although Lau said the script of the remake had some "golden quotes", he also felt it had a bit too much profanity. He ultimately rated The Departed eight out of ten and said the Hollywood remake is worth a view, although according to Lau's spokeswoman Alice Tam, he felt the combination of the two female characters into one in The Departed was not as good as the original storyline.

A few critics were disappointed in the film, including J. Hoberman of the Village Voice, who wrote, "Infernal Affairs was surprisingly cool and effectively restrained for HK action, but Scorsese raises the temperature with every ultraviolent interaction. The surplus of belligerence and slur reach near-Tarantinian levels—appropriate as he's staking a claim to QT's turf."

=== Top ten lists ===
The film appeared on many critics' top-ten lists of the best films of 2006. Carrie Rickey of The Philadelphia Inquirer, Joe Morgenstern of The Wall Street Journal, Ruthe Stein of the San Francisco Chronicle, and Steven Rea of The Philadelphia Inquirer named it one of the top-ten films of 2006. Richard Roeper of the Chicago Sun-Times named it the best film of the 2000s.

- 1st – Richard Roeper, Ebert and Roeper
- 1st – Peter Travers, Rolling Stone
- 1st – Rene Rodriguez, The Miami Herald
- 1st – Scott Tobias, The A.V. Club
- 1st – Joshua Rothkopf, Time Out New York
- 1st – Philip Martin, Arkansas Democrat-Gazette
- 1st – James Berardinelli, ReelViews
- 2nd – Chris Kaltenbach, The Baltimore Sun
- 2nd – Adam Kempenaar, Filmspotting
- 2nd – Keith Phipps, The A.V. Club
- 2nd – Mike Russell, The Oregonian
- 2nd – Richard James Havis, The Hollywood Reporter
- 2nd – Richard Schickel, TIME
- 3rd – Frank Scheck, The Hollywood Reporter
- 4th – Glenn Kenny, Premiere
- 4th – Marc Savlov, The Austin Chronicle
- 4th – Michael Wilmington, Chicago Tribune
- 4th – Roger Ebert, Chicago Sun-Times
- 5th – Empire
- 5th – David Ansen, Newsweek
- 5th – Kevin Crust, Los Angeles Times
- 5th – Lisa Schwarzbaum, Entertainment Weekly
- 5th – Stephen Hunter, The Washington Post
- 6th – Ann Hornaday, The Washington Post
- 6th – Jack Mathews, Daily News
- 6th – Nathan Rabin, The A.V. Club
- 6th – Ty Burr, The Boston Globe
- 7th – Nathan Lee, The Village Voice
- 7th – Noel Murray, The A.V. Club
- 7th – Peter Hartlaub, San Francisco Chronicle
- 8th – Michael Sragow, The Baltimore Sun
- 9th – Claudia Puig, USA Today
- 9th – Lou Lumenick, New York Post
- 9th – Desson Thomson, The Washington Post
- 9th – Michael Rechtshaffen, The Hollywood Reporter

=== Accolades ===
At the 64th Golden Globe Awards on January 15, 2007, The Departed won one award for Best Director (Martin Scorsese), while being nominated for five other awards including Best Picture, Best Actor (Leonardo DiCaprio), Best Supporting Actor (Jack Nicholson, Mark Wahlberg) and Best Screenplay (William Monahan).

At the 79th Academy Awards on February 25, 2007, The Departed won four Academy Awards: Best Picture (Graham King), Best Director (Martin Scorsese), Best Film Editing (Thelma Schoonmaker), and Best Adapted Screenplay Writing (William Monahan).

The film marked the first time Scorsese won an Oscar after five previous losses. Many felt he deserved it years earlier for prior efforts. Some felt he deserved it for his prior nominations, and the win was described as a "Lifetime Achievement Award for a lesser film". Scorsese joked he won because "this is the first movie I've done with a plot".

At the 11th Satellite Awards on December 18, 2006, The Departed won awards for Best Ensemble, Motion Picture, Best Motion Picture, Drama, Best Screenplay – Adapted (William Monahan) and Best Actor in a Supporting Role (Leonardo DiCaprio). In 2008, it was nominated for the American Film Institute Top 10 Gangster Films list.

In 2021, members of Writers Guild of America West (WGAW) and Writers Guild of America, East (WGAE) ranked its screenplay 30th in WGA's "101 Greatest Screenplays of the 21st Century (so far)". In 2025, the film ranked number 31 on The New York Times' list of "The 100 Best Movies of the 21st Century" and number 25 on the "Readers' Choice" edition of the list.

== Home media ==
The Departed was released by Warner Home Video on DVD, HD-DVD and Blu-ray disc on February 13, 2007. The film is available in a single-disc fullscreen (1.33:1), single-disc widescreen (2.39:1) edition, and 2-disc special edition. The second disc contains deleted scenes, a featurette about the influence of New York's Little Italy on Scorsese, a Turner Classic Movies profile, a theatrical trailer, and a 21-minute documentary titled Stranger Than Fiction: The True Story of Whitey Bulger, Southie and The Departed, about the crimes that influenced Scorsese in creating the film, including the story of James "Whitey" Bulger, on whom Jack Nicholson's character is based. The film was released on Ultra HD Blu-ray on April 23, 2024.

== Music ==
=== Soundtrack ===
The Departed: Music from the Motion Picture

Soundtrack album by Various Artists
- Released: November 7, 2006
- Genres: Rock, country, pop
- Length: 45:21
- Label: Warner Sunset
- Producer: Jason Cienkus

Track Listing
No.	Title	Writer(s)	Artist(s)	Length
1.	"Comfortably Numb"	Roger Waters; David Gilmour	Roger Waters (Feat. Van Morrison & The Band)	7:59
2.	"Sail On, Sailor"	Brian Wilson; Van Dyke Parks; Raymond Louis Kennedy; Tandyn Almer; Jack Rieley	The Beach Boys	3:18
3.	"Let It Loose"	Mick Jagger; Keith Richards	The Rolling Stones	5:18
4.	"Sweet Dreams"	Don Gibson	Roy Buchanan	3:32
5.	"One Way Out"	Elmore James; Sonny Boy Williamson II; Marshall Sehorn; Willie Dixon	The Allman Brothers Band	4:57
6.	"Baby Blue"	Pete Ham	Badfinger	3:36
7.	"I'm Shipping Up to Boston"	Al Barr; Matt Kelly; Marc Orrell; Ken Casey; James Lynch (music); Woody Guthrie (lyrics)	Dropkick Murphys	2:34
8.	"Nobody but Me"	Ronald Isley; O'Kelly Isley, Jr.; Rudolph Isley	The Human Beinz	2:18
9.	"Tweedle Dee"	Winfield Scott	LaVern Baker	3:10
10.	"Sweet Dreams (of You)"	Don Gibson	Patsy Cline	2:34
11.	"The Departed Tango"	Howard Shore	Howard Shore, Marc Ribot	3:32
12.	"Beacon Hill"	Howard Shore	Howard Shore, Sharon Isbin	2:33

=== Score ===
The film score for The Departed was written by Howard Shore and performed by guitarists Sharon Isbin, G. E. Smith, Larry Saltzman and Marc Ribot. The score was recorded in Shore's studio in New York State. The album, The Departed: Original Score, was released December 5, 2006, by New Line and produced by Jason Cienkus.

Scorsese described the music as "a very dangerous and lethal tango", and cited the guitar-based score of Murder by Contract and the zither in The Third Man as inspiration.

The film also quotes significantly from Donizetti's opera Lucia di Lammermoor. Frank Costello is seen listening to the famous sextet from Act 2 of the opera, and has its theme as his phone ringtone.

== Sequel ==
Writer William Monahan wrote a script for a sequel, which producer Roy Lee considered "an amazing idea" that overcame the hurdle of most of the main characters being dead by the end of The Departed. It was ultimately shelved due to the expense and Scorsese's lack of interest in participating. This differs from the original Infernal Affairs, which has a prequel and a sequel to tie up loose ends.

== See also ==
- "The Debarted", an episode of The Simpsons that parodies the film
- List of American films of 2006
- List of films that most frequently use the word fuck
