= Okemah Rising =

Studio album by Dropkick Murphys
- Released: May 12, 2023
- Recorded: 2022
- Studio: The Church Studio (Tulsa, Oklahoma)
- Genre: Celtic punk, folk rock
- Length: 28:52
- Label: Dummy Luck Music

Dropkick Murphys chronology
This Machine Still Kills Fascists (2022)	Okemah Rising (2023)	For the People (2025)

Singles from Okemah Rising
- 1. "I Know How It Feels" Released: March 1, 2023; 2. "Gotta Get to Peekskill" Released: March 30, 2023; 3. "Bring It Home (featuring Jaime Wyatt)" Released: May 31, 2023

Professional ratings
Review scores
Source	Rating
Blabbermouth.net	8/10

Okemah Rising is the twelfth studio album by American band Dropkick Murphys, released on May 12, 2023, on Dummy Luck Music. The album was recorded in 2022 during the band's recording sessions for This Machine Still Kills Fascists and like the songs from that album, the songs are composed of unused lyrics and words from Woody Guthrie. Like with the previous album, Okemah Rising does not feature vocalist Al Barr who was on hiatus from the band to take care of his ailing mother. The album was executive produced by Guthrie's daughter Nora Gutherie and also features appearances by Violent Femmes, Jaime Wyatt, Jesse Ahern and Woody's grandson Cole Quest. The album features a reworked "Tulsa Version" of the band's biggest hit, "I'm Shipping Up to Boston", which was originally written by Guthrie.

== Background ==
The album was recorded in Tulsa in Woody Guthrie's home state of Oklahoma at Leon Russell's The Church Studio. With Al Barr on hiatus from the band, the band thought it was the ideal time to record an acoustic album. The band released the first album from these recording sessions, This Machine Still Kills Fascists, in 2022.

== Promotion ==
The album was preceded by the first single and music video for "I Know How It Feels" on March 1, 2023. The album's second single, "Gotta Get to Peeksill" (featuring Violent Femmes), was released on March 31, 2023, with a music video being released on April 6, 2023. The album's third single and music video for "Bring It Home" (featuring Jaime Wyatt), was released on May 31, 2023.

The band's early 2023 dates in Europe featured the first performances of songs from Okemah Rising. The band will continue to promote the album throughout their annual St. Patrick's Day shows in the US, which begin in March 2023.

For people who preordered the vinyl version of Okemah Rising through the band's website, received a free limited edition 7-inch vinyl featuring acoustic versions of "Barroom Hero" and "Skinhead on the MBTA" recorded live at the Ryman Auditorium in Nashville. The 7-inch will not be sold at retail.

== This Machine Rising documentary ==
On August 30, 2024, the band released the short documentary, This Machine Rising, on YouTube. The film "tells the story of Dropkick Murphys' journey with Woody Guthrie's lyrics, focusing on the Tulsa sessions (the recording of This Machine Still Kills Fascists and Okemah Rising), the theater tour, and the enduring power of music and words to unite the working class and promote equity.

== Track listing ==
All tracks are written by Woody Guthrie.

Okemah Rising track listing
No.	Title	Length
1.	"My Eyes Are Gonna Shine"	2:12
2.	"Gotta Get to Peekskill" (featuring Violent Femmes)	2:46
3.	"Watchin the World Go By"	3:37
4.	"I Know How It Feels"	2:46
5.	"Rippin Up the Boundary Line" (featuring Jesse Ahern)	3:27
6.	"Hear the Curfew Blowin"	3:04
7.	"Bring It Home" (featuring Jaime Wyatt)	3:22
8.	"When I Was a Little Boy"	2:32
9.	"Run Hitler Run"	2:42
10.	"I'm Shipping Up to Boston" (Tulsa Version)	2:24
Total length:		28:52

Vinyl edition bonus track
No.	Title	Length
11.	"Talking Hard Work" (Woody Guthrie cover)

== Personnel ==
Dropkick Murphys

- Tim Brennan – guitar, accordion, vocals
- Ken Casey – lead vocals, bass
- Jeff DaRosa – banjo, mandolin, acoustic guitars, vocals
- Matt Kelly – drums, percussion, vocals
- Kevin Rheault – bass
- Campbell Webster – bagpipes, uilleann pipes
- James Lynch – guitars, vocals

Additional musicians

- Cole Quest – dobro guitar, backing vocals

== Charts ==
Chart performance for Okemah Rising
Chart (2023)	Peak position
German Albums (Offizielle Top 100)	19
Scottish Albums (OCC)	37
Swiss Albums (Schweizer Hitparade)	63
UK Album Downloads (OCC)	87
UK Independent Albums (OCC)	16
