= Jeff Erna =

American drummer

Jeff Erna is an American drummer, from Boston, Massachusetts, most notable for being the original drummer for the punk bands Dropkick Murphys and Street Dogs.

== Career ==
Erna began his professional career in the Boston garage band Jared, which produced its single "Space Traveler" in 1980. He was the original drummer for the punk/new wave band The Blackjacks and drummed for the Boston based rock band The Outlets.

In 1996, Erna, The Outlets' guitarist Rick Barton, singer Mike McColgan, and bassist Ken Casey formed the Dropkick Murphys. Erna would appear on the band's earliest 7" records, compilation appearances and their Boys on the Docks EP before leaving the band in 1997 shortly before the recording of their debut album, Do or Die. Erna was replaced by their current drummer Matt Kelly.

In 2002, Erna along with Mike McColgan formed the punk band Street Dogs. Erna recorded the band's debut album, 2003's Savin Hill, and appeared in the music video for the album's title track before leaving the band that same year.

Erna has also been the drummer for a reformed Nervous Eaters, one of Boston's first punk/new wave bands.

== Discography ==
=== Jared ===
- Space Traveler 7" (1980)

The Boston Bootleg varulven records

=== The Blackjacks ===
- Basic Blackjacks (1984)
- Mr. Beautiful Presents All Hard (compilation) (1985)
- Rock Turns To Stone (compilation) (1988)

Dress in black (1985)

=== Dropkick Murphys ===
- Dropkick Murphys / Ducky Boys 7" (1996)
- I've Got My Friends-Boston/San Francisco Split CD
- Runt of the Litter, Vol. 2 (compilation) (1996)
- TKO Records Presents: The 1998 Street Punk Title Bout 7" (1997)
- Tattoos and Scally Caps 7" (1997)
- Fire and Brimstone 7" (1997)
- Boys on the Docks (1997)
- The Bruisers / Dropkick Murphys 7" (1997)
- Give 'Em the Boot (compilation) (1997)
- Oi! Skampilation Vol. 3 (compilation) (1997)
- The Early Years (1998)
- The Singles Collection, Volume 1 (2000)

=== Street Dogs ===
- Demo (2002)
- Savin Hill (2003)
- Street Dogs / The Dents - Round One EP (2004)

=== Nervous Eaters ===
- Eat This! (2003)
- No More Idols / Today And Tomorrow 7" (2004)
