= The Singles Collection, Volume 1 =

Compilation album by Dropkick Murphys
- Released: May 23, 2000
- Recorded: 1996–1997
- Genre: Punk
- Length: 57:42
- Label: Hellcat

Dropkick Murphys chronology
Unity (1999)	The Singles Collection, Volume 1 (2000)	Sing Loud, Sing Proud! (2001)

Singles Collection chronology
The Early Years (1998)	The Singles Collection, Volume 1 (2000)	Singles Collection, Volume 2 (2005)

Professional ratings
Review scores
Source	Rating
AllMusic	4/5 stars

The Singles Collection, Volume 1 is a collection of non-album tracks by Dropkick Murphys. It is the American version of The Early Years which was released in England in 1998, although with some track changes. This album contains everything the band recorded before their first album, Do or Die, except for the Boys on the Docks EP and compilation tracks from I've Got My Friends and Runt of the Litter Volume 2, as well as exclusive live tracks.

== Song information ==
The album includes six covers: The Clash's "Career Opportunities", "Guns of Brixton" and "White Riot"; The Pogues' "Billy Bones"; and Slapshot's "I've Had Enough" are standalone tracks, while the band also covers AC/DC's "T.N.T." during the song "Skinhead on the MBTA (Live)."

Track numbers	Originally Appeared On
1,2	DKM/Ducky Boys Split 7 inch released July, 1996
3-6	Tattoos and Scally Caps released February, 1997
7-10	Fire and Brimstone released February, 1997
11,12	The Bruisers/Dropkick Murphys Split 7 inch released September, 1997
13,14	Anti-Heros vs Dropkick Murphys released November, 1997
15-23	N/A - Recorded live at the Do or Die record release party on February 8, 1998, in Cambridge, MA
24	N/A - Recorded live at the Boston Pride show in November, 1997

== Track listing ==
All songs by Dropkick Murphys unless otherwise noted.

1. "Barroom Hero" – 3:09
2. "Fightstarter Karaoke" – 2:33
3. "John Law" – 2:15
4. "Regular Guy" – 1:53
5. "3rd Man In" – 2:19
6. "Career Opportunities (Live)" (Joe Strummer, Mick Jones) – 1:53
7. "Never Alone" – 3:18
8. "Take It or Leave It" – 2:02
9. "Eurotrash" – 1:36
10. "Front Seat" – 2:33
11. "Denial" – 2:24
12. "Billy's Bones" (Shane MacGowan) – 2:03
13. "Road of the Righteous" – 2:50
14. "Guns of Brixton" (Paul Simonon) – 2:47 (studio, erroneously credit as being live on the CD)
15. "Cadence to Arms (Live)" (Traditional, Dropkick Murphys) – 2:26
16. "Do or Die (Live)" – 1:48
17. "In the Streets of Boston (Live)" – 1:14
18. "Never Alone (Live)" – 2:40
19. "Get Up (Live)" – 2:05
20. "Far Away Coast (Live)" – 2:46
21. "Boys on the Docks (Live)" – 2:53
22. "Skinhead on the MBTA (Live)" (contains cover of "T.N.T." by AC/DC) (Traditional, Dropkick Murphys, Angus Young, Malcolm Young, Bon Scott) – 4:45
23. "I've Had Enough (Live)" (Jack Kelly, Slapshot) – 1:42
24. "White Riot (Live)" (Joe Strummer, Mick Jones) – 1:48

== Personnel ==
- Mike McColgan – vocals
- Ken Casey – bass guitar, vocals
- Rick Barton – guitar
- Matt Kelly – drums on live tracks
- Jeff Erna – drums on all studio tracks and "Career Opportunities" (live)
