= I'm Shipping Up to Boston =

Single by Dropkick Murphys

from the album The Warrior's Code and The Departed: Music from the Motion Picture
- Released: 2006
- Studio: Q Division (Somerville)
- Genre: Celtic punk
- Length: 2:34
- Label: Hellcat
- Composers: Al Barr; Ken Casey; Matt Kelly; James Lynch; Marc Orrell
- Lyricist: Woody Guthrie
- Producers: David Bianco; Ken Casey

Dropkick Murphys singles chronology
"The Warrior's Code" (2005)	"I'm Shipping Up to Boston" (2006)	"The State of Massachusetts" (2008)

Music video
- "I'm Shipping Up to Boston" on YouTube

"I'm Shipping Up to Boston" is a song by the Celtic punk band Dropkick Murphys, with lyrics written by folk singer Woody Guthrie.

The original version of the song was released in 2004 on Give 'Em the Boot IV and was re-recorded for their certified gold selling 2005 album, The Warrior's Code. The song gained worldwide attention for its use in the 2006 film The Departed, which boosted the band's popularity.

The song's lyrics describe a sailor who lost a prosthetic leg climbing the topsail, and is shipping up to Boston to "find [his] wooden leg." These were taken from a fragment of paper that Ken Casey found while looking through Woody Guthrie's archives. The Dropkick Murphys put music to the lyrics as they did with the song "Gonna Be a Blackout Tonight" from the 2003 album Blackout.

The single is the band's most successful so far and was certified platinum. It reached No. 1 on the Bubbling Under Hot 100 chart and sold over 1,044,000 digital copies without ever entering the Hot 100 chart.

The video features the Dropkick Murphys performing the song on the waterfront in East Boston. The band is also seen "hanging out" with hooligans while being chased by Boston police officers. The "hanging out" parts were later replaced with footage from The Departed for a second video tying in to the film. During President Joe Biden's April 2023 trip to Ireland, he went onstage for a speech to the song.

== Charts ==
Chart (2007)	Peak position
US Bubbling Under Hot 100 (Billboard)	1
Chart (2012)	Peak position
France (SNEP)	174
Ireland (IRMA)	54
Chart (2013)	Peak position
Switzerland (Schweizer Hitparade)	45
Chart (2016)	Peak position
Czech Republic Modern Rock (IFPI)	3

== Certifications ==
Region	Certification	Certified units/sales
Italy (FIMI)	Gold	25,000^{‡}
New Zealand (RMNZ)	Gold	15,000^{‡}
United Kingdom (BPI)	Gold	400,000^{‡}
United States (RIAA)	Platinum	1,000,000^{^}
^{^} Shipments figures based on certification alone.^{‡} Sales+streaming figures based on certification alone.

== Other versions ==
- The song was covered by Finnish melodic death metal band Children of Bodom, and appeared on their 2012 compilation album Holiday at Lake Bodom.
- The song was covered by Australian children's music group The Wiggles, and appeared on their 2022 album ReWiggled.
- The Boston Crusaders of Drum Corps International included the song as part of the repertoire for their 2023 production, White Whale.
