= Do or Die (Dropkick Murphys album) =

Studio album by Dropkick Murphys
- Released: January 27, 1998
- Recorded: 1997
- Studio: The Outpost (Stoughton)
- Genres: Celtic punk; Oi!; hardcore punk
- Length: 40:07
- Label: Hellcat
- Producer: Lars Frederiksen

Dropkick Murphys chronology
Boys on the Docks (1997)	Do or Die (1998)	The Gang's All Here (1999)

Do or Die is the debut studio album by American Celtic punk band Dropkick Murphys, released on January 27, 1998, through Hellcat Records. It was produced by Lars Frederiksen of the punk band Rancid. It is the only album that featured original lead vocalist Mike McColgan, who went on to become a fireman before forming his own band, the Street Dogs and is their first release with drummer Matt Kelly who joined the band in 1997 replacing their founding drummer Jeff Erna.

Some of the songs on the album were re-recorded and previously appeared on other releases. The original versions of "Barroom Hero" and "Fightstarter Karaoke" first appeared on the band's debut release Dropkick Murphys/Ducky Boys Split 7 inch in 1996. "Baroom Hero" also appeared on the 1997 on the first Give 'Em the Boot compilation following the band signing to Hellcat. The original version of "3rd Man In" appeared on the Tattoos and Scally Caps 7" in 1997. The original versions of "Never Alone" and "Boys on the Docks" previously appeared on their debut Boys on the Docks EP in 1997. With the exception of "Boys on the Docks", the original versions of these songs appeared on the band's The Singles Collection, Volume 1 album that was released in 2000. A music video for the single "Barroom Hero" was also released.

== Track listing ==
Many songs were a collaborative effort.

1. "Cadence to Arms" (Instrumental) (Traditional, reworked from "Scotland the Brave") – 1:49
2. "Do or Die" (Barton, McColgan) – 1:50
3. "Get Up" (Barton, Casey, McColgan) – 2:06
4. "Never Alone" (Barton, Casey) – 2:54
5. "Caught in a Jar" (Barton, McColgan) – 2:19
6. "Memories Remain" (Casey, Kelly) – 2:25
7. "Road of the Righteous" (Barton, McColgan) – 2:56
8. "Far Away Coast" (Barton, Casey, McColgan) – 2:41
9. "Fightstarter Karaoke" (Barton, Casey) – 2:18
10. "Barroom Hero" (Casey) – 2:57
11. "3rd Man In" (Barton, Casey) – 2:18
12. "Tenant Enemy #1" (Barton, Casey, Kelly, McColgan) – 2:13
13. "Finnegan's Wake" (Traditional) – 2:19
14. "Noble" (Barton, Casey, Kelly, McColgan) – 2:34
15. "Boys on the Docks" (Murphys' Pub Version) (Barton, Casey) – 2:33
16. "Skinhead on the MBTA" (Traditional, reworked from M.T.A.) (Barton, Casey) – 3:49

== Reception ==
Professional ratings
Review scores
Source	Rating
AllMusic	3/5 stars
Chicago Sun-Times	3.5/5 stars
Daily Herald	3.5/5 stars
The San Diego Union-Tribune	3/4 stars
Spin	7/10 stars
The Virginian-Pilot	(favorable)

The Washington Post noted that "combining the Clash and the Pogues may not be an especially clever maneuver, but the result is certainly rousing." The Telegram & Gazette wrote that "the band strikes an earnest pose that champions anyone wearing a blue collar, be it one below a scally cap or shaved head." AllMusic gave Do or Die a rating of three stars out of five, and said that the album was "an interesting blend of hardcore-style punk with traditional Irish inflections."

== Legacy ==
On March 17, 2025, Mike McColgan and the Bomb Squad performed Do or Die in its entirety along at a special St. Patrick's Day performance in Long Beach, CA.

== Personnel ==
- Mike McColgan – lead vocals
- Ken Casey – bass, vocals
- Rick Barton – guitar, vocals
- Matt Kelly – drums
- Joe Delaney – bagpipes
- Swingin' Utters – featured on the track "Skinhead on the MBTA"
- John Allen of Big Bad Bollocks, vocals and tin whistle on "Faraway Coast"
