= Boys on the Docks =

EP by Dropkick Murphys
- Released: July 7, 1997
- Recorded: April 1997
- Genres: Punk rock; Oi!; street punk; hardcore punk
- Length: 13:33
- Label: Cyclone Records

Dropkick Murphys chronology
Dropkick Murphys/Ducky Boys Split 7 inch (1996)	Boys on the Docks (1997)	Do or Die (1998)

Boys on the Docks is a 1997 EP by American Celtic punk band Dropkick Murphys.

Boys on the Docks was the band's first EP; it was released nearly a year before their first full-length studio album, Do or Die. Bassist Ken Casey is the only band member who has been with the band since recording this EP.. Drummer Jeff Erna would leave the band shortly before the release of the EP and was replaced by current drummer Matt Kelly in May 1997. Singer Mike McColgan would leave the band after their debut album in 1998 while guitarist Rick Barton would leave the band in 2000.

"Never Alone" and "Boys on the Docks" were re-recorded for Do or Die. Another re-recorded version of "Boys on the Docks" (with singer Al Barr who replaced McColgan) appeared along with a cover of "In the Streets of Boston" (changed to "In the Streets of London") by The Business for their 1999 split album Mob Mentality. "Caps and Bottles" was re-recorded for their 2001 album, Sing Loud, Sing Proud! with Al Barr.

== Track listing ==
All songs by Rick Barton and Ken Casey unless otherwise noted.

1. "Boys on the Docks" – 2:31
2. "Never Alone" – 2:59
3. "In the Streets of Boston" (Casey, Close, Mike McColgan) – 1:15
4. "Caps and Bottles" – 2:41
5. "Eurotrash" (Barton, Casey, McColgan) – 1:48
6. "Front Seat" (Barton, McColgan) – 2:19

== Credits ==
- Mike McColgan – vocals
- Rick Barton – guitar
- Ken Casey – bass
- Jeff Erna – drums
