= Which Side Are You On? =

American pro-labor union song

Song
- Written: 1931
- Songwriter: Florence Reece

"Which Side Are You On?" is a song written in 1931 by activist Florence Reece, who was the wife of Sam Reece, a union organizer for the United Mine Workers in Harlan County, Kentucky. In June 2026, CBS News included the song in its list of the 250 essential American songs of the past 250 years.

== Background ==
UFW version of the song, from the Delano grape strike

In 1931, miners and mine owners in southeastern Kentucky were engaged in a labor struggle called the Harlan County War. In an attempt to intimidate the family of union leader Sam Reece, Sheriff J. H. Blair and his men, hired by the mining company, illegally entered Reece's home in search of him. Reece had been warned and escaped but his wife, Florence, and their children were in the house. That night, after the men had gone, Florence wrote the lyrics to "Which Side Are You On?" on a calendar that hung in their kitchen. She said she borrowed the melody from a traditional Baptist hymn, "Lay the Lily Low", though there are other iterations of the tune like the traditional ballad "Jack Monroe".

Reece supported a second wave of miner strikes circa 1973, as recounted in the documentary Harlan County, USA. She and others perform "Which Side Are You On?" in the documentary. Reece also recorded the song later in life; it can be heard on the album Coal Mining Women.

== Recordings ==
Pete Seeger, collecting labor union songs, learned "Which Side Are You On" in 1940. The following year, it was recorded by the Almanac Singers in a version that gained a wide audience. Billy Bragg, Deacon Blue, Dropkick Murphys, Natalie Merchant, Ani DiFranco, Elvis Costello and Joan Baez, Rebel Diaz, Tom Morello, Panopticon, and S.G. Goodman have all recorded their own interpretations of the song.

The song is referred to by Bob Dylan in the song "Desolation Row". It was also the inspiration for the title of Alessandro Portelli's 2011 book on Harlan County's coal mining community.

=== Other versions ===
Which side are you on?
Rendition of the song, sung by George Mann & the Sydney Trade Union Choir

- The Almanac Singers – Talking Union, 1941
- Charlie Byrd – Charlie Byrd at the Village Vanguard, 1961
- The Weavers – The Weaver's Almanac, 1963
- Pete Seeger – Greatest Hits, 1967
- Frederic Rzewski – Four North American Ballads, for solo piano, 1979
- Arlo Guthrie – Outlasting the Blues, 1979
- Spirituál kvintet – "Za svou pravdou stát" (Stand Behind Your Truth), in Czech, on Dostavník 18, 1983
- Billy Bragg – Between the Wars, 1985
- Dick Gaughan – True and Bold, 1985
- The Savage Rose – Hvis Side Er Du På, 1989, in Danish
- Paprsky inženýra Garina – Na čí, 1991, in Czech
- Deacon Blue – Riches & More, 1997
- Ella Jenkins – Ella Jenkins and a Union of Friends Pulling Together, 1999
- Blue Highway – Still Climbing Mountains, 2001
- Dropkick Murphys – Sing Loud, Sing Proud!, 2001, and Live on St. Patrick's Day from Boston, MA, 2002
- Anne Feeney – Union Maid, 2003
- Peter, Paul and Mary – 2003
- Natalie Merchant – The House Carpenter's Daughter, 2003
- Silas House – Songs for the Mountaintop, 2006, and Public Outcry, 2008
- The Nightwatchman – Union Town, 2011
- Ani DiFranco – ¿Which Side Are You On?, 2012
- Panopticon – Kentucky, 2012
- Argyris Nikolaou (Αργύρης Νικολάου) – "Διάλεξε Πλευρά" (Choose a Side), 2014, in Greek
- KollektivA – The Revolution Sessions, 2015
- Talib Kweli & 9th Wonder – Indie 500, 2015
- S.G. Goodman – Which Side Are You On?, 2020
- The Homobiles – 2021
- Hańba! & Hiob Dylan – "Za kim idziesz?" (Who are you following?), 2026, in Polish

== In other media ==
- Ken Loach used the title for his 1984 documentary on the music and poetry written about the 1984-1985 miners' strike in the UK.
- Alessandro Portelli's book They Say in Harlan County: An Oral History (Oxford University Press, 2010) takes its title from a line of the song.
- John W. Hevener's book Which Side Are You On? The Harlan County Coal Miners, 1931–39 (University of Illinois Press, 2002) is titled after the song.
- The short documentary Get Up, Stand Up: The Story of Pop and Protest (2003) features the song.
- The 2016 drama In Dubious Battle uses Pete Seeger's recording of the song during the end credits.
- Damnation episode 2 features the song, Florence Reece, and the Harlan miner's strike.
- The HBO series Succession season 1, episode 6 is entitled "Which Side Are You On?" and uses the song.
- Posters with the words "Which side are you on?" and "The whole world is watching" were used to support protestors tearing down the statue of Silent Sam, a Confederate monument, at the University of North Carolina at Chapel Hill in 2018.
- An ad for US presidential candidate Bernie Sanders during the 2020 Democratic Primaries uses the song.
- In response to the killing of Michael Brown, protesters briefly interrupted a performance of the St. Louis Symphony Orchestra with the Requiem for Mike Brown, which began as "Which Side Are You On?"
- Civil Rights Movement activists The Freedom Singers adapted their own version of the song.
- Sarah Lee Guthrie performed a version of the song at a Bernie Sanders rally in 2020.
- The words and melody of the refrain were the basis of the song "Sag mir wo du stehst", one of the most well-known songs of the East Germany song movement of the late 1960s. It was recorded by Oktoberklub.
- Megan Slankard remixed the song in 2020, keeping the chorus but changing the verses to be related to candidate Bernie Sanders.
- The Homobiles released "Which Side Are You On?" as a single in 2021, with altered lyrics that refer to fighting fascism and to homosexual police as implied class traitors.
