= Sing Loud, Sing Proud! =

Studio album by Dropkick Murphys
- Released: February 6, 2001
- Recorded: 2000 at the Outpost, Stoughton, Massachusetts
- Genres: Celtic punk; punk rock; Oi!; street punk
- Length: 45:10
- Label: Hellcat Records
- Producer: Ken Casey

Dropkick Murphys chronology
| The Singles Collection, Volume 1 (2000) | Sing Loud, Sing Proud! (2001) | Live on St. Patrick's Day from Boston, MA (2002) |

Singles from Sing Loud, Sing Proud!
- 1. "Good Rats" Released: June 2000; 2. "The Spicy McHaggis Jig" Released: 2001; 3. "The Gauntlet" Released: 2001; 4. "The Wild Rover" Released: 2002

Sing Loud, Sing Proud! is the third studio album from Boston punk rock band the Dropkick Murphys. The album was released on February 6, 2001 through Hellcat.

The album is the final release to feature founding guitarist Rick Barton, who left the band early into the recording of the album and only appears on three songs. The album features various new members since their previous album. In 2000, guitarist James Lynch of Boston punk band The Ducky Boys joined the band shortly before Barton's departure while 17 year old guitarist Marc Orrell was added as well. The new lineup was rounded out by mandolin player, Ryan Foltz and bagpipe player, Spicy McHaggis, who are only featured on this album.

Music videos were released for the songs "The Spicy McHaggis Jig", "The Gauntlet" and "The Wild Rover".

== Recording ==
The album features collaborations with Shane MacGowan, vocalist of The Pogues, on the song "Good Rats", and Colin McFaull of Cock Sparrer, on the song "The Fortunes of War", which was about the death of Brian Deneke. The album also features and updated version of the song "Caps And Bottles" which originally appeared on their debut EP, 1997's Boys on the Docks. "The Legend of Finn MacCumhail" was previously released on the band's 1998 single, "Curse of a Fallen Soul" and performed on The Gang's All Here tour. In addition, it includes covers of Irish folk classics, "The Rocky Road to Dublin" and "The Wild Rover", a cover of "Which Side Are You On?", as well as a rendition of the Boston College fight song, "For Boston".

== Reception ==
Professional ratings
Review scores
| Source | Rating |
|---|---|
| The Advertiser | 3.5/5 stars |
| Allmusic | 3/5 stars |
| Calgary Herald | 3/4 stars |
| Herald Sun | (favorable) |
| PopMatters | Positive |
| Punknews.org | 4/5 stars |
| Reno Gazette-Journal | 4/4 stars |
| The San Diego Union-Tribune | 3/4 stars |
| Telegram & Gazette | 3/4 stars |
| Village Voice | (favorable) |

Allmusic gave Sing Loud, Sing Proud! a score of three stars out of five, and called it "a decent addition to the band's album roster." Punknews.org gave the album four out of five stars said the album "blends the sounds of 'Do or Die' and 'The Gang's All Here,'" and that "the Murphy's skill is in blending their folk influences into their street punk sound, without losing the attitude and energy of the latter. This separates the band from acts with similar setups like Flogging Molly."

== Cover art ==
The mural on the cover actually exists in South Boston on the corner of West Broadway and C Streets on the wall of "Al's Liquor Store." The mural was painted by Tricia O'Neill and her father Patrick O'Neill in the summer of 2000. Tricia was hired by Ken Casey and his wife, Jenn. Their relationship continued—Pat was in the follow-up album's video for "Walk Away" and Tricia photographed the "Blackout" cover and interior artwork, then both the Dropkick and Tricia became involved with the Red Sox. The Dropkicks' Music became synonymous with the team while Tricia began doing all the hand lettering in Fenway Park during the expansion of the park of course with the help of her father Pat and also her husband Steve Brettler. A more recent collaboration was some photography at a Dropkick Murphys show in Dublin, Ireland at the "Vicar Street" venue.

== Track listing ==
All songs by Al Barr, Ken Casey and Matt Kelly, unless otherwise noted.

1. "For Boston" (T.J. Hurley) – 1:33
2. "The Legend of Finn MacCumhail" – 2:15
3. "Which Side Are You On?" (Florence Reece) – 2:28
4. "The Rocky Road to Dublin" (Traditional) – 2:37
5. "Heroes from Our Past" – 3:31
6. "Forever" – 3:08
7. "The Gauntlet" – 2:49
8. "Good Rats" – 3:03
9. "The New American Way" – 3:32
10. "The Torch" – 3:17
11. "The Fortunes of War" – 2:43
12. "A Few Good Men" – 2:36
13. "Ramble and Roll" – 1:59
14. "Caps and Bottles" (Casey) – 2:41
15. "The Wild Rover" (Traditional) – 3:25
16. "The Spicy McHaggis Jig" – 3:27

== Personnel ==
Dropkick Murphys:

- Al Barr – vocals
- Rick Barton – additional guitars on "The Torch", "The New American Way" and "Fortunes of War" (founding guitarist of the band quit early during the album's recording)
- Ken Casey – bass guitar, vocals
- Matt Kelly – drums, bodhrán, vocals
- James Lynch – guitar, vocals
- Marc Orrell – guitar, accordion, vocals
- Ryan Foltz – mandolin, tin whistle, dulcimer
- Spicy McHaggis – bagpipes on "The Spicy McHaggis Jig" (also credited with "excessive smoking and under-aged drinking" in the album sleeve notes)

additional personnel:

- Shane MacGowan – vocals on "Good Rats"
- Colin McFaull – vocals on "Fortunes of War"
- Desi Queally – vocals on "Rocky Road to Dublin"
- Joe Delaney – bagpipes on "Heroes of Our Past" and "For Boston"
- Brian Queally – tin whistle on "Rocky Road to Dublin"
- Johnny Cunningham – mandolin on "Good Rats"
- Andreas Kelly – accordion on "The Torch"
- Zack Brines – piano on "Ramble and Roll"
- Carl Kelly – uilleann pipes on "Forever"
- Jim Siegal – engineer
