= Rick Barton (musician) =

American musician

Rick Barton is an American musician and producer from Boston, MA, who is currently the singer, guitarist and songwriter of the band Continental. Barton was previously a founding member and guitarist of the rock band, The Outlets and a founding member and guitarist for the punk band Dropkick Murphys.He is currently a member of founding Dropkick Murphys singer Mike McColgan's band Michael McColgan and the Bomb Squad.

Barton along with his brother David Alex Barton formed The Outlets in the early 80s and were an acclaimed live band in the Boston area. The Outlets attained success in the greater Boston music scene but failed to gain national attention when they signed with Restless/Enigma in 1985, despite modest critical acclaim including a recommendation from Billboard Magazine. They are best known for the single "Knock Me Down", which was a regional hit.

Barton would eventually leave The Outlets (who have reformed without him) and form the Dropkick Murphys in 1996.

With the Dropkick Murphys, Barton would record their debut EP, 1997's Boys on the Docks along with their first two studio albums, 1998's Do or Die and it's follow-up album, 1999's The Gang's All Here, along with various 7" compilation appearances. In 2000, Barton announced that he was leaving the band and retiring from music to be with his family.

Barton would unretire in 2007 and formed the punk rock band, Everybody Out!. The band released a self-titled EP in 2007 and in 2008 they released their self-titled debut album in along with the Struggle & Strife EP. In the years that followed, Barton would go on to produce music for founding Dropkick Murphys singer Mike McColgan's bands Street Dogs and FM359.

Barton most recently founded the band Continental with his son Stephen who plays bass. When the band isn't on the road, the father and son team paint houses to support their "music addiction". The band's sound has been described as "Paul Westerberg writing songs for The Rolling Stones." The band have released four albums with their most recent album, Home on the Range, being released in 2016.

On July 3, 2026, Michael McColgan and the Bomb squad released a cover of Warren Zevon's "Roland the Headless Thompson Gunner" to streaming services. The song will be the first of five new songs released by the group with the other four being originals and they will released in the weeks following the first song's release. The group consists of McColgan, Barton, Johnny Rioux, Rhys Kill, Paul Rucker and Rob Rogers.

== Discography ==
=== The Outlets ===
- Boy's Life Vs. The Outlets 7" (1980)
- A Wicked Good Time! (compilation) (1981)
- Best Friends 7" (1982)
- Let's Breed (compilation) (1984)
- Whole New World (1985)
- If I Were the One / Can't Cheat the Reaper 7" (1985)
- Sheila / A Valentine Song 7" (1985)
- Restless Variations (compilation) (1986)
- A Fistful of Hits (compilation) (1987)
- I Remember (1999)

=== The Laurels ===
- Zoom (Take The Test) 12" (1984)

=== Dropkick Murphys ===
- Dropkick Murphys / Ducky Boys 7" (1996)
- I've Got My Friends-Boston/San Francisco Split CD
- Runt of the Litter, Vol. 2 (compilation) (1996)
- TKO Records Presents: The 1998 Street Punk Title Bout 7" (1997)
- Tattoos and Scally Caps 7" (1997)
- Fire and Brimstone 7" (1997)
- Boys on the Docks (1997)
- The Bruisers / Dropkick Murphys 7" (1997)
- Give 'Em the Boot (compilation) (1997)
- Oi! Skampilation Vol. 3 (compilation) (1997)
- The Early Years (1998)
- Do or Die (1998)
- German Lager vs. Irish Stout 7" (1998)
- Curse of a Fallen Soul 7" (1998)
- The Gang's All Here (1999)
- Give 'Em the Boot II (compilation) (1999)
- Music With Attitude Volume 31 (compilation) (1999)
- Especial Punk (compilation) (1999)
- Mob Mentality 7" (1999)
- Mob Mentality (album) (1999)
- Unity 7" (1999)
- Live on a Five 5" (2000)
- This Is the East Coast (...Not L.A.) 10" (2000)
- The Singles Collection, Volume 1 (2000)
- Back on the Streets 10" (2000)
- Singles Collection, Volume 2 (2005)
- The Meanest of Times (additional guitar on "The State of Massachusetts") (2007)

=== Hudson Falcons ===
- For Those Whose Hearts and Souls Are True (writer) (2001)

=== Everybody Out! ===
- Everybody Out! E.P. (2007)
- Struggle & Strife EP (2008)
- Everybody Out! (2008)

=== Street Dogs ===
- Street Dogs (producer) (2010)
- Vans Warped Tour '11 (Compilation) (producer, "Punk Rock And Roll") (2011)
- Crooked Drunken Sons EP (producer) (2013)
- Rustbelt Nation EP (producer) (2013)
- Stand For Something Or Die For Nothing (writer, "Angels Calling") (2018)

=== FM359 ===
- Truth, Love and Liberty (producer/writer, vocals on "I Saw the Light") (2014)

=== Continental ===
- Death of a Garage Band (2011)
- All a Man Can Do (2012)
- 1000 Miles 7" (2014)
- Millionaires (2014)
- Home on the Range (2016)
- Hello (2023)

=== Mike McColgan and the Bomb Squad ===
- "Roland the Headless Thompson Gunner" (2026)
