= For Boston =

Fight song for Boston College

"For Boston" is the traditional fight song of Boston College and Boston College High School. It was written and composed by T.J. Hurley, a member of the Boston College Class of 1885.

== Lyrics ==
For Boston, for Boston,

We sing our proud refrain!

For Boston, for Boston,

'Tis Wisdom's earthly fane.

For here all are one

And their hearts are true,

And the towers on the Heights

Reach to Heav'ns own blue.

For Boston, for Boston,

Till the echoes ring again!

For Boston, for Boston,

Thy glory is our own!

For Boston, for Boston,

'Tis here that Truth is known.

And ever with the Right

Shall thy heirs be found,

Till time shall be no more

And thy work is crown'd.

For Boston, for Boston,

For Thee and Thine alone.

The lyrics were modified in the 1980s to reflect coeducation: the 5th line, "For here Men are Men," and the 16th line, "Shall thy sons be found," were changed to "For here all are one" and "Shall thy heirs be found," respectively.

== In popular culture ==
In 2001, the song was performed by the Boston punk rock band Dropkick Murphys for their third studio album, Sing Loud Sing Proud. The Dropkick Murphys' version is often played at Boston College football games. An instrumental version of the song is briefly featured in the Season 28 Episode of The Simpsons, “The Town” during a parade for the fictional “Boston Americans” football team.

In 2021, Netflix's Moxie, directed by BC alumn Amy Poehler, uses the BC fight song in a high school pep rally scene.
