= Dropkick Murphys/Ducky Boys Split 7 inch =

EP by Dropkick Murphys / The Ducky Boys
- Released: July 1996
- Recorded: 1996
- Genres: Punk rock; street punk
- Label: Flat Records

Dropkick Murphys / The Ducky Boys chronology
Dropkick Murphys/Ducky Boys Split 7 inch (1996)	Boys on the Docks (1997)

Split 7inch is a split EP by Dropkick Murphys and The Ducky Boys. It was released in July 1996 on Flat Records, with 2,000 copies on black vinyl and 1,000 copies on green vinyl. This is the first release by both bands. The Dropkick Murphys tracks were later re-released on The Singles Collection, Volume 1.

== Track listing ==
=== Side A (Dropkick Murphys) ===
1. "Barroom Hero" (Rick Barton/Ken Casey)
2. "Fightstarter Karaoke" (Rick Barton/Ken Casey/Mike McColgan)

=== Side B (The Ducky Boys) ===
1. "Cross To Bear" (Mark Lind/Mike Marsden/Jason Messina)
2. "Pride" (Mark Lind)

== Personnel ==
Dropkick Murphys:

- Mike McColgan - vocals
- Rick Barton - guitar, backup vocals
- Ken Casey - bass, backup vocals
- Jeff Erna - drums
- Joe Delaney - bagpipes on 'Barroom Hero'

The Ducky Boys:

- Mike Marsden - guitar, vocals
- Mark Lind - bass, vocals
- Jason Messina - drums
- Mike O'Leary - guitar, vocals
