= The Gang's All Here (Dropkick Murphys album) =

Studio album by Dropkick Murphys
- Released: March 16, 1999
- Recorded: 1998
- Genres: Celtic punk, punk rock, oi!
- Length: 42:51
- Label: Hellcat
- Producer: Lars Frederiksen

Dropkick Murphys chronology
Do or Die (1998)	The Gang's All Here (1999)	Unity (1999)

Singles from The Gang's All Here
- 1. "Curse of a Fallen Soul" Released: 1998; 2. "10 Years of Service" Released: 1999

The Gang's All Here is the second studio album by the American Celtic punk band Dropkick Murphys, released on March 16, 1999, through Hellcat Records. It is their first album with Al Barr (ex-vocalist for The Bruisers), who replaced founding singer Mike McColgan in 1998. It would be the last full album to feature guitarist Rick Barton, who left the band in 2000 during the recording of Sing Loud, Sing Proud.

"10 Years of Service" was the album's only single; the music video received some minor airplay on MTV's 120 Minutes, a first for the band.

The album was produced by Rancid's Lars Frederiksen, who had produced their debut album as well. It was the final Dropkick Murphys album to be produced by Frederiksen.

The album peaked at No. 184 on the Billboard 200.

== Critical reception ==
Professional ratings
Review scores
Source	Rating
AllMusic	3/5 stars
The Encyclopedia of Popular Music	3/5 stars
PopMatters	6.4/10

CMJ New Music Report wrote that "Barr's gravelly voice complements '77-style punk riffs that fly by faster than a speeding bullet." Rolling Stone thought that "the four band members pummel through their anthems like punked-out Rock 'Em Sock 'Em robots."

AllMusic wrote that while the album "[took] up the expected us-against-the-world pose," its songwriting was of a higher standard than contemporary punk albums.

== Track listing ==
All songs by Ken Casey and Matt Kelly unless otherwise noted

1. "Roll Call" – 0:32
2. "Blood and Whiskey" – 1:47
3. "Pipebomb on Lansdowne" – 1:50
4. "Perfect Stranger" – 1:58
5. "10 Years of Service" – 2:45
6. "Upstarts and Broken Hearts" – 2:56
7. "Devil's Brigade" – 1:27
8. "Curse of a Fallen Soul" – 3:00
9. "Homeward Bound" – 2:00
10. "Going Strong" – 3:06
11. "The Fighting 69th" (Traditional) – 3:13
12. "Boston Asphalt" – 1:39
13. "Wheel of Misfortune" – 3:50
14. "The Only Road" – 2:11
15. "Amazing Grace" (Instrumental) (John Newton) – 2:38
16. "The Gang's All Here" – 7:59
  - Military drumming, then silence until a hidden track of Rick Barton's answering machine.

== Personnel ==
- Al Barr – vocals
- Rick Barton – guitar
- Ken Casey – bass guitar/vocals
- Matt Kelly – drums
- Joe Delaney – bagpipes on "Amazing Grace"
- Johnny Cunningham – fiddle on "Wheel of Misfortune" and "The Gang's All Here"
- Colum Lundt - drums
- Tularch Ard Pipe and Drum Corps – drums on "Roll Call"
- Jim Seigal – engineer
- Thomas "T.J." Johnson – engineer on "Roll Call"
- Marco Almera – cover
