= Blackout (Dropkick Murphys album) =

Studio album by Dropkick Murphys
- Released: June 10, 2003
- Recorded: 2002–2003
- Genre: Celtic punk, punk rock
- Length: 46:42
- Label: Hellcat
- Producer: Ken Casey

Dropkick Murphys chronology
Live on St. Patrick's Day from Boston, MA (2002)	Blackout (2003)	Tessie (2004)

Singles from Blackout
- 1. "Walk Away" Released: 2003; 2. "Fields of Athenry" Released: 2004

Blackout is the fourth studio album by Dropkick Murphys, released in 2003. A music video for "Walk Away", the album's first official single, was also released. The song went on to become a minor radio hit and received some minor airplay on MTV. "Fields of Athenry" was also released as a single. The album was released with a DVD, which contained live videos for "Rocky Road to Dublin" and "Boys on the Docks", a music video for "Gonna Be a Blackout Tonight" (which was the last release to feature an appearance by Ryan Foltz who left the band before recording the album), and a trailer for their then upcoming untitled full-length DVD, which became On the Road With the Dropkick Murphys and was released the following year in March 2004.

== History ==
"The Dirty Glass" was originally featured on the 2002 split Face to Face vs. Dropkick Murphys and re-recorded for the album with the band's then merchandise seller, Stephanie Dougherty (Kay Hanley appeared on the original version), who shared vocals with Ken Casey and also appeared on the album's final track, "Kiss Me, I'm Shitfaced". The track "Time to Go", a homage to the Boston Bruins, was released as a promotional CD for the Bruins and also featured in Tony Hawk's Underground and NHL 2005. The track "This Is Your Life" was featured in the 2003 video game Backyard Wrestling: Don't Try This at Home.

The song "Gonna Be a Blackout Tonight", with lyrics written by Woody Guthrie, was composed when Nora Guthrie's son, a fan of the Dropkick Murphys, approached his mother about letting the band use some of Woody's lyrics. Bass guitarist Ken Casey was familiar with the Mermaid Avenue albums by Billy Bragg and Wilco that had also used lyrics written by Woody Guthrie, and had enjoyed those works. The band decided to make the Woody Guthrie track the "hardest song on the record" in order to make it as different as possible from the folk music that Woody Guthrie sang.

In 2005, the band released a two-song CD single for the family of Andrew K. Farrar, Jr., a sergeant in the U.S. Marine Corps who was killed on January 28, 2005 in Al Anbar, Iraq during Operation Iraqi Freedom. Farrar, who was a big fan of the Murphys, made a request to his family that if he did not survive his tour of duty, he wanted their version of "The Fields of Athenry" to be played at his funeral. The single features a slower version of "The Fields of Athenry" that was originally recorded and placed in Farrar's casket, although the band decided to release the alternate version. The disc also features the track "Last Letter Home," which was written about Farrar and was featured on the Murphys' 2005 album The Warrior's Code. All of the proceeds for the $10 single go to the Sgt. Andrew Farrar Memorial Fund and can be purchased through the band's website or at one of their shows.

The song "Buried Alive" deals with the Quecreek Mine Rescue which occurred in July 2002, describing the plight nine Pennsylvania coal miners faced while trapped underground for four days.

The album was the last to feature the band's touring and recording bagpipe player Joe Delaney. Delaney was with the band from 1998-1999 however left and was replaced by Spicy McHaggis in 2000. Following the departure of McHaggis in 2003, Delaney would return to record Blackout and was replaced for the tour in 2003 by Scruffy Wallace who remained with the band until 2015.

== Reception ==
Professional ratings
Review scores
Source	Rating
Allmusic	4/5 stars
Boston Globe	(favorable)
Boston Herald	3.5/4 stars
Fort Worth Star-Telegram	4/5 stars
Philadelphia Daily News	A−
PopMatters	Positive
Punknews.org	4/5 stars
Robert Christgau	(choice cut)
Rolling Stone	3/5 stars
Telegram & Gazette	(favorable)
Times Colonist	4/5 stars
Yomiuri Shimbun	(favorable)

Allmusic gave Blackout a score of four stars out of five, saying that the album was the band's "tightest material to date" and that it combined the "intensity" of earlier albums with "a bit more polish." PopMatters praised the album by saying "What makes the album work is the band realizing that no song should be filler on a record." They also compared “World Full of Hate” (which they called the highlight of the record) to Green Day's "Good Riddance (Time of Your Life)" and called "Dirty Glass" a 'modern day' "Fairytale of New York." Punknews.org's review commented on the band's more stripped-down sound on this record: "On their latest effort the band have dropped most of the Irish instruments and arrangements from their sound and focused more on a punk sound with a folksy edge to it." It also pointed out the band's lyrical maturity. "The songwriting also seems more mature than before and the lyrics have matured to deal with a variety of topics including the plight of the working class, changes in life, life’s failures, and the loss of loved ones," they noted.

== Track listing ==
All songs by Dropkick Murphys unless otherwise noted.

1. "Walk Away" – 2:51
2. "Worker's Song" (Ed Pickford) – 3:32
3. "The Outcast" – 3:10
4. "Black Velvet Band" (Traditional, arranged by Dropkick Murphys) – 3:03
5. "Gonna Be a Blackout Tonight" (Woody Guthrie, arranged by Dropkick Murphys) – 2:39
6. "World Full of Hate" – 2:22
7. "Buried Alive" – 1:57
8. "The Dirty Glass" (Ken Casey, Marc Orrell) – 3:38
9. "Fields of Athenry" (Pete St. John) – 4:24
10. "Bastards on Parade" – 3:50
11. "As One" – 3:01
12. "This Is Your Life" – 3:43
13. "Time to Go" – 2:53
14. "Kiss Me I'm Shitfaced" – 5:34

== 10" and 7" track listing ==
All songs by Dropkick Murphys unless otherwise noted

"Blackout 10" (Limited to 6,000 copies. First 250 released online and autographed by the band)"

Side A

1. "Walk Away" – 2:51
2. "Buried Alive" – 1:57
3. "Gonna Be a Blackout Tonight" (Woody Guthrie, Dropkick Murphys) – 2:39

Side B

1. "Fields of Athenry" (Pete St. John) – 4:24
2. "Bastards on Parade" – 3:50
3. "It's a Long Way to the Top (If You Wanna Rock 'n' Roll)" (Angus Young, Malcolm Young, Bon Scott) – 4:43

"The Fields Of Athenry 7" (Limited to 2,000 copies)"

1. "The Fields of Athenry"
2. "I'm Shipping up to Boston"
3. "If I Were a Carpenter (Live)"
4. "Back to the Hub"

== CD singles ==
"Walk Away (European release only)"

1. "Walk Away"
2. "We Got the Power"
3. "Victory"

"The Fields of Athenry (Limited to 600 copies)"

1. "The Fields of Athenry"
2. "I'm Shipping up to Boston"
3. "If I Were a Carpenter (Live)"

"The Fields of Athenry Promo (Given away at Soccer match in Glasgow, Scotland)"

1. "The Fields of Athenry"
2. "Buried Alive"

"Time to Go (Limited to 12,000 copies - released at Boston Bruins game)"

1. "Time to Go"
2. "The Dirty Glass"

== Personnel ==
=== Dropkick Murphys ===
- Al Barr – vocals
- Ken Casey – bass guitar, vocals
- Matt Kelly – drums, bodhrán, vocals
- James Lynch – guitar, vocals
- Marc Orrell – guitar, accordion, vocals

=== Additional personnel ===
- Joe Delaney – bagpipes
- Stephanie Dougherty – vocals on "The Dirty Glass" and background vocals on "Kiss Me, I'm Shitfaced"
- Jim Siegel – engineer
- Ryan Foltz - songwriter
