= Jaime Wyatt =

American singer-songwriter

- Birth name: Jaime Wyatt O'Neill
- Born: September 29, 1985 (age 39); Santa Monica
- Genres: Country; Outlaw country; Americana
- Labels: New West Records; Forty Below Records; Lakeshore Records

Jaime Wyatt O'Neill (born September 29, 1985), aka Jaime Wyatt, is an American Americana and outlaw country music singer, songwriter, and guitarist who has released three studio albums: Felony Blues (2017), Neon Cross (2020), and Feel Good (2023), as well as a self-titled EP.

== Biography ==
=== Early life ===
Wyatt was born in Santa Monica to parents, Rhonda Knight and Mike, musicians she describes as "hippies", who gave her the middle name Wyatt after Wyatt Earp. Her great-grandparents played country music and her uncle was a champion fiddle player. Her father grew up in an Irish-Catholic family; her grandmother was from Dublin. Wyatt grew up in Fox Island, Washington, in what she describes as "the woods". She grew up going to mass every week. She has two older sisters, horseback riders whereas she was interested in skateboarding. Her parents divorced when she was age 10. She lost contact with her father while her mother struggled financially as a single parent. She went to concerts often; her first was Bonnie Raitt, whom her dad knew. Her father was also friends with Bobby Weir. She played little league and was the only girl on the team. She self-identifies as "part Cherokee", stating that her family moved from Oklahoma to California.

In 2002, at age 17, shortly after high school, she was discovered by producer Skip Williamson, who moved her to Los Angeles and signed her to his Lakeshore Records.

=== Career ===
On Lakeshore, in 2004, she released a self-titled EP produced by Pete Droge. Songs from the EP were featured in the films: Wicker Park (2004), The Midnight Meat Train (2008), and Feast of Love (2007). One song, "Mind Candy" was re-recorded by Tiffany Darwish.

In January 2017, she released "Your Loving Saves Me", featuring Sam Outlaw.

In February 2017, Wyatt debuted her first album Felony Blues with Forty Below Records. The songs address topics including her crime, addiction, depression, and recovery.

In March 2018, Wyatt was featured on the song "Skinny Elvis" by Sam Morrow.

In February 2020, Wyatt released Neon Cross, produced by Shooter Jennings.

Wyatt is featured on the song "Bring It Home" by Dropkick Murphys, released in May 2023.

In November 2023, Wyatt released Feel Good, her third studio album, on New West Records.

== Personal life ==
Wyatt is queer; she started to realize it when she was 18 years old, although she remained closeted for much of her life. Before she was totally sure that she was gay, she married a male best friend. After undergoing therapy, she realized that was gay and asked for a divorce; she is still best friends with her former husband. She "came out" to her family when she was 30 years old. Wyatt is non-binary.

Wyatt became a drug user after she was unsuccessful in the music business. At age 21, she robbed her heroin dealer, leading to an 8-month prison sentence as part of a plea bargain, reduced from a possible 3-year sentence. She attended meetings with Narcotics Anonymous and had encouragement by Shooter Jennings to become sober.

Despite growing up in a religious household, Wyatt says she no longer follows organized religion, although she says that spirituality is a big part of her life; she still prays and meditates.

Wyatt lives in Nashville; she moved there in August 2019.
