= Unity (Dropkick Murphys and Agnostic Front EP) =

EP by Dropkick Murphys and Agnostic Front
- Released: December 1999
- Genre: Punk rock
- Length: 10:06

Dropkick Murphys chronology
The Gang's All Here (1999)	Unity (1999)	Mob Mentality (2000)

Agnostic Front chronology
Riot, Riot, Upstart (1999)	Unity (1999)	Dead Yuppies (2001)

Unity is a split album by American punk bands Dropkick Murphys and Agnostic Front. It was released in December 1999.

== Song information ==
Song	Performed by	Originally performed by	Notes
"Nobody's Hero"	Dropkick Murphys	Stiff Little Fingers	Also appears on Singles Collection, Volume 2
"Pipebomb on Lansdowne (Extended Dance Remix)"	Dropkick Murphys		Also appears on Singles Collection, Volume 2
"9 Seconds Remaining"	Agnostic Front		
"Sit and Watch (Demo Version)"	Agnostic Front		Appears on Riot, Riot, Upstart as full version.

== Track listing ==
1. "Nobody's Hero" (Stiff Little Fingers/Gordon Ogilvie) – 3:49
2. "Pipebomb on Lansdowne" (Extended Dance Remix) (Dropkick Murphys) – 2:03
3. "9 Seconds Remaining" (Agnostic Front) – 2:22
4. "Sit and Watch (demo version)" (Agnostic Front) – 1:52
