= The Bruisers =

- Origin: Portsmouth, New Hampshire, U.S.
- Genre: Oi!
- Years active: 1988–1998; 2005
- Label: Taang! Records

The Bruisers were a punk band that pioneered the American streetpunk/oi! movement, formed in Portsmouth, New Hampshire in 1988. The original lineup included: Al Barr (vocals, now the lead singer of the Boston punk band Dropkick Murphys), Scotty Davies (bass), Jeff Morris (guitar) and Rodger Shosa (drums). Morris is now a guitarist and lead vocalist for Death & Taxes, and a former guitarist for Mark Lind & the Unloved. Former guitarist Rick Wimert died 1995.

The first band members were skinheads (although not white power skinheads). After a few years and lineup changes, the band and their style changed slightly. By 1996, Al Barr was the only remaining original member of The Bruisers. One notable release by the band was a 7" split with Barr's future band Dropkick Murphys in 1997. After 10 years, the band broke up in 1998. The Bruisers had a reunion concert on September 14, 2005 at The Roxy in Boston. The bill included local acts The Ducky Boys and Tommy & The Terrors, as well as The Casualties from New York City. The Bruisers played a second reunion show on August 31, 2012 headlining the first night of the 2000 Tons of TNT Fest at the Webster Theater in Hartford, CT.

== Former members ==
- Al Barr – vocals (1988–1998, 2005)
- Jeff Morris – guitar (1988–1996, 2005)
- Scotty Davies – bass (1988–1990)
- Rodger Shosa – drums (1988–1989)
- Dan Connors – drums (1989–1997, 2005)
- Crash – guitar (1989–1990)
- Rick Wimert – guitar (1990–1995)
- Todd Seely – bass (1990–1991), guitar (1996–1997)
- Keith "Ritchie" Richards – bass (1991–1996, guitar (1997–1998, 2005)
- Robert Garceau – guitar (1995–1996)
- Scott Vierra – guitar (1996–1998, 2005)
- Johnny Rioux – bass (1996–1998)
- John Dicicco – drums (1997–1998)
- Mike Savitkas – bass (2005)

== Discography ==
=== Albums ===
- Cruisin' for a Bruisin' (1993)
- Up in Flames (1996)

=== EPs/singles ===
- Intimidation (1989)
- Independence Day (1990)
- American Night (1991)
- Gates of Hell (1994)
- Clobberin' Time (1995)
- Mad Parade/Bruisers (1995)
- Still Standing Up (1997)
- The Bruisers/Charge 69 (1998)
- Molotov (1997)
- Bruisers/Randumbs (1998)
- The Bruisers/Dropkick Murphys (1998)

=== Compilation albums ===
- Society's Fools (1996)
- Anything You Want It's All Right Here...: The Authorized Bruisers 1988–1994 (1998)
- One Law for Them...Another One for Us (1999)
- In The Pit – Live and Rare (2000)
- Better Days (2000)
- Singles Collection 1989–1997 (2004)
