= Marc Orrell =

American guitarist (born 1982)

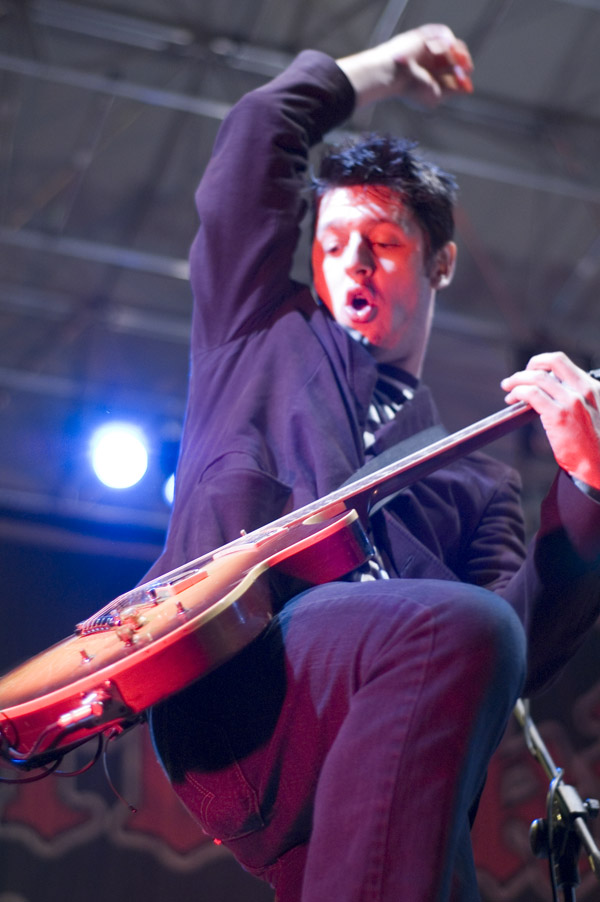
Marc Orrell in 2007

Marc John Orrell (born November 7, 1982) is an American guitarist known for being a former member of the Boston Celtic punk band the Dropkick Murphys. Nicknamed "The Kid", Orrell joined the band in 2000 when he was 17 years old. He first appeared on their 2001 album Sing Loud, Sing Proud and would appear on 2003's Blackout, 2005's The Warrior's Code and 2007's The Meanest of Times, his final album with the group before leaving the band following the tour in January 2008 to pursue a different musical style.

Orrell has played with the bands 7/10 Split, The Eleventh Hour, Gimme Danger, Far From Finished, The Black Pacific, and most recently, Wild Roses.

In June 2019, Orrell, alongside Flogging Molly's Ted Hutt and The Pogues' James Fearnley announced the formation of a new supergroup, The Walker Roaders. The Walker Roaders' debut record was released on August 23, 2019.
