= Al Barr =

American singer

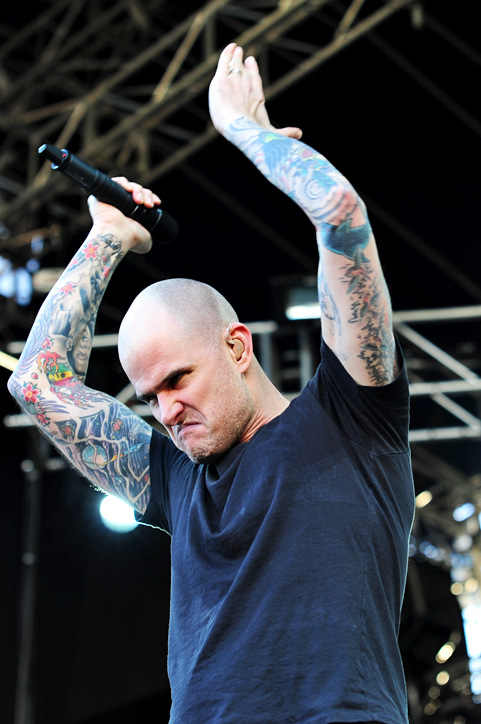
- Al Barr performing at the No Sleep Til Festival in 2010

Background information
- Born: Alexander Barr; January 21, 1968 (age 58); Hanover, New Hampshire, U.S.
- Genres: Celtic punk; hardcore punk; Oi!; punk rock
- Instrument: Vocals
- Years active: 1984–present
- Member of: Dropkick Murphys
- Formerly of: The Bruisers; Direct Vole Assault; 5 Balls of Power
- Website: http://www.dropkickmurphys.com

Alexander Martin Barr (born January 21, 1968) is an American musician. He is best known for his time as the lead singer of the Dropkick Murphys, whom he joined in 1998. As of 2022, he is on hiatus from the band to care for his mother. He was also a founder and lead singer for The Bruisers, which he helped form in 1988 in Portsmouth, New Hampshire. His first band, circa 1984, was called D.V.A. (Direct Vole Assault). He also went on to front 5 Balls of Power with future members of Scissorfight, The Radicts, L.E.S. Stitches, and US Bombs, before he formed The Bruisers.

The Bruisers had played many shows with Boston's Dropkick Murphys, and when lead singer Mike McColgan quit the band in 1998, they asked Barr to be the new lead singer. The first album the Dropkick Murphys released with Barr as singer was 1999's The Gang's All Here. As of 2024, the band has released nine albums with Barr, with the most recent being 2021's Turn Up That Dial; however, he does make an appearance on the band's 2025 album, For the People.

== Personal life ==
Barr is of paternal Scottish descent and maternal German descent. He makes German-language remarks to audiences in German-speaking countries.

In December 2003, Barr and his wife Jessica had their first child, Strummer Barr, who was named after Joe Strummer of The Clash. They had their second child, a daughter, December 7, 2008, and their third child and second son on October 10, 2012.

In February 2022 it was announced that Barr was forced to drop off of the Dropkick Murphys' 2022 St. Patrick's Day Tour and their 2022 summer tour in Europe to take care of his ailing mother, who is battling Lewy Body Dementia. Jesse Ahern, Mikey Rivkees of The Rumjacks, and Jen Razavi of The Bombpops assisted on vocals for certain songs in place of Barr, with Ken Casey taking over other vocal duties for Barr. Ken Casey has since been taking over as full-time lead vocalist on the albums and during their live performances.

In 2023, Barr provided guest vocals on The Defiant song "Where Did Lady Liberty Go?" and on August 31, 2024, Barr made a surprise appearance during The Defiant's set where they were opening for NOFX in Brockton, MA. Dropkick Murphys opened for NOFX the following day; however, Barr did not join them for their set. In 2025, Barr made a guest appearance on Dropkick Murphys' album For the People on its song "The Vultures Circle High".

On March 17, 2026, Barr joined Dropkick Murphys for the encores during their St. Patrick’s Day concert at the Citizens House of Blues in Boston, Massachusetts. Songs that Barr performed with the band included “Worker’s Song,” “The Vultures Circle High,” “Alcohol,” and “I’m Shipping Up to Boston.” This marked Al Barr’s first performance with Dropkick Murphys since 2022.

In an Instagram post on June 28, 2026, Al Barr posted about his family and upcoming guest appearances on other band's albums saying he will be recording two miles away from where his mother lives. He also mentioned his hopes for the future with the Dropkick Murphys saying "I’m still hoping to return to @dropkickmurphys someday…But there really is no way of predicting what is going to happen with my mom."

== Discography ==
The Bruisers

- Intimidation (1989)
- Independence Day (1990)
- American Night (1991)
- Cruisin' for a Bruisin' (1993)
- Gates of Hell (1994)
- Clobberin' Time (1995)
- Mad Parade/Bruisers (1995)
- Up in Fun (1996)
- Still Standing Up (1997)
- Molotov (1997)
- The Bruisers/Charge 69 (1998)
- Anything You Want It's All Right Here...: The Authorized Bruisers 1988–1994 (1998)
- Bruisers/Randumbs (1998)
- The Bruisers/Dropkick Murphys (1998)
- Singles Collection 1989–1997 (2004)

with Dropkick Murphys

- The Gang's All Here (1999)
- Mob Mentality (split album with The Business) (2000)
- The Singles Collection, Volume 1 (2000)
- Sing Loud, Sing Proud! (2001)
- Live on St. Patrick's Day from Boston, MA (2002)
- Blackout (2003)
- Tessie (2004)
- Singles Collection, Volume 2 (2005)
- The Warrior's Code (2005)
- The Meanest of Times (2007)
- Live on Lansdowne, Boston MA (2010)
- Going Out in Style (2011)
- Live at Fenway (2012)
- Signed and Sealed in Blood (2013)
- Rose Tattoo: For Boston Charity EP (2013)
- 11 Short Stories of Pain & Glory (2017)
- Turn Up That Dial (2021)
- For the People (2025) (appears on the song "The Vultures Circle High")

== Sources ==
- Helmer, April (April 23, 2004). "Dropkick Murphys always sing loud, proud". The Express Times. Dropkick Murphys.com. Archived from the original on 2007-10-20.
