= Matt Kelly (drummer) =

American drummer

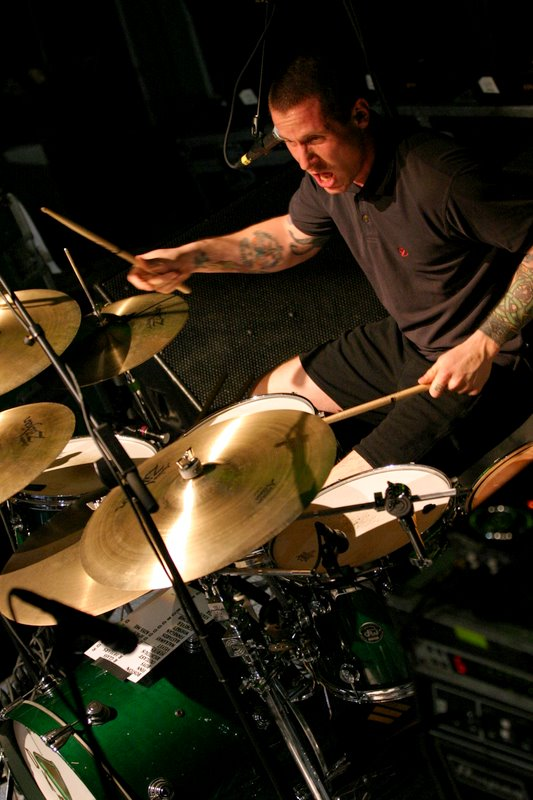
- Kelly in 2007

Background information
- Born: Leominster, Massachusetts, U.S.
- Genres: Celtic punk; hard rock
- Instrument: Drums
- Years active: 1997–present
- Member of: Dropkick Murphys

Matt Kelly is an American musician from Leominster, Massachusetts. He has been the drummer for the Boston Celtic punk group Dropkick Murphys since May 1997 when he replaced the band's founding drummer Jeff Erna.Kelly has appeared on every album by the band since their 1998 debut Do or Die. Kelly also sings background vocals for the band and has not missed playing a show with the band for 22 years as of 2019.

== Gear ==
Matt's Kelly's drum kit consists of an 8x12 rack, a 14x14, 16x16 floors, and a 20x22 kick. He mostly uses a 6.5x14 snare. His kit is emerald green acrylic, with custom wood badges with Celtic symbols on "claw style wood hoops". Kelly calls these drums "my green precious emeralds." He uses a DW 5000 kick pedal, and Zildjian cymbals.

Kelly has been influenced by rock drummers such as John Bonham, Phil Rudd, and Ian Paice, and also jazz musicians like Art Blakey, Joe Morello, Max Roach, and Philly Joe Jones.

== Personal life ==
Kelly was born in Leominster, Massachusetts, one of three children. His father, Ed, was also a drummer and played for the Psych/Garage band Pugsley Munion. Kelly took six years of drumming lessons starting when he was eight years old, with Don Kirby at the Music Box in Fitchburg, Massachusetts. He has been married to his wife Liz since 2007.
