= Ken Casey =

American musician

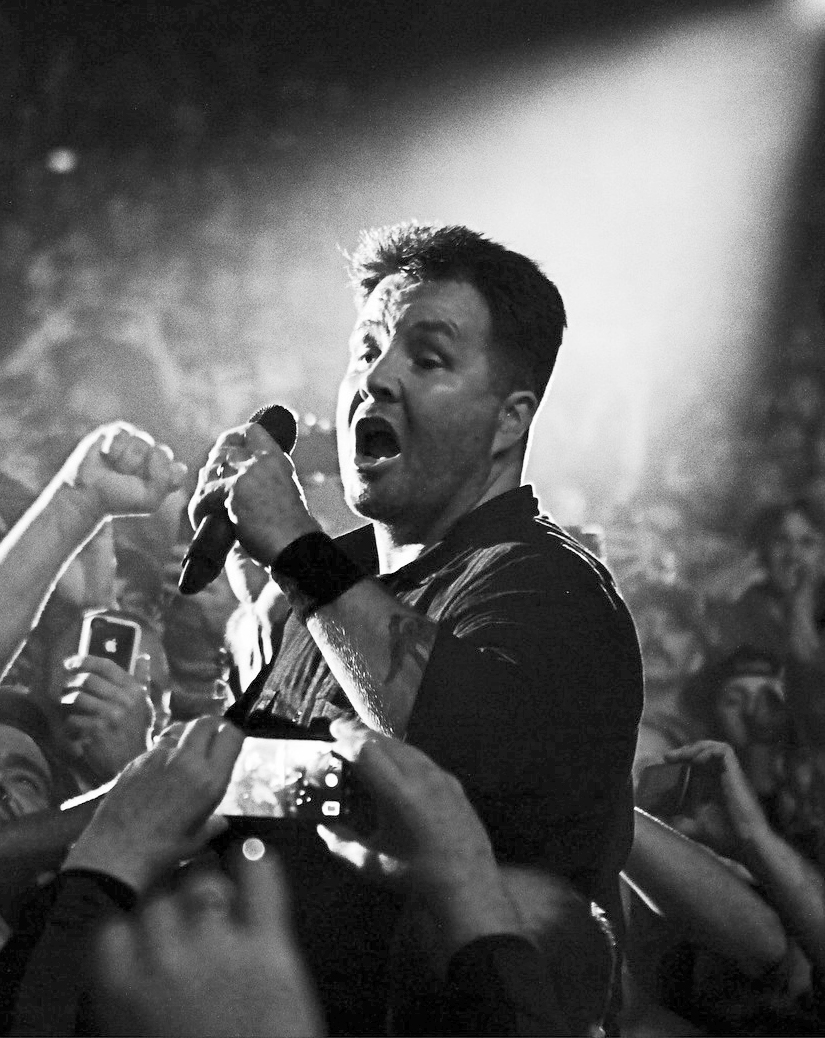
- Casey in concert

Background information
- Born: Kenneth William Casey Jr. April 15, 1969 (age 57); Milton, Massachusetts, U.S.
- Genres: Celtic punk; folk punk
- Occupations: Singer; musician; songwriter
- Instruments: Vocals; bass guitar
- Years active: 1996–present
- Member of: Dropkick Murphys

Kenneth William Casey Jr. (born April 15, 1969) is an American musician who is the primary songwriter, one of the lead singers, and formerly bassist of the Boston Celtic punk group Dropkick Murphys. Casey was one of the original members, starting the band in 1996 with guitarist Rick Barton and singer Mike McColgan. He is the only original member of the Dropkick Murphys left in the band, though drummer Matt Kelly joined shortly after their formation in 1997.

Casey is known for his melodic vocal parts and solid punk rock bass playing. Casey also founded the charity group The Claddagh Fund; owns two Boston restaurants, McGreevy's (which closed in August 2020) and Yellow Door Taqueria; and runs his own boxing promotion called Murphys Boxing. Casey has a small role in the 2016 film Patriots Day, about the 2013 Boston Marathon bombing and the subsequent terrorist manhunt.

== Early life ==
Casey was born and raised in Milton, Massachusetts. The son of Eileen Kelly and Ken Casey Sr., he is of Irish descent. His father died when he was very young and he was brought up under the wing of his grandfather, John Kelly, a teamster and union worker. The Dropkick Murphys song "Boys on the Docks" is dedicated to Kelly.

He worked in various jobs and studied at University of Massachusetts Boston before forming the band.

== Personal life ==
Casey has 3 children and lives on the South Shore outside of Boston. He is a die-hard fan of the Boston Red Sox, Boston Bruins, Boston Celtics and New England Patriots, and participated in the Boston Bruins AT&T Legends Classic hockey game on January 2, 2010. Other participants included Tim Robbins, Bobby Farrelly, Terry O'Reilly, and Lenny Clarke. Casey scored the winning goal for his team in the second period.

In 2009, Casey founded The Claddagh Fund, a charity foundation based on the attributes of the Irish Claddagh symbolism: "Friendship, Love and Loyalty." It was founded with the help of Boston Bruins legend Bobby Orr.

In October 2014, Casey, a lifelong Democrat, announced that he was co-hosting a fundraiser for Republican gubernatorial candidate Charlie Baker. Casey stated that "Charlie is a Republican and I'm a Democrat, but I will take a big heart and strong character over political party any day." Casey, who publicly backed Mayor Marty Walsh's campaign in 2013, also said that Baker helped several of Dropkick Murphys' charitable causes over the years, including supporting military families. Casey is among many Massachusetts Democrats to have supported Baker.

On May 20, 2016, Casey and the Dropkick Murphys received the "Robert F. Kennedy Children's Action Corps' Embracing the Legacy Award" for years of charity work with various organizations including work with children and military veteran. The award, "which parallels Robert F. Kennedy's quest for social justice on behalf of society's most vulnerable people" was presented to the band at the Kennedy Library.

In 2018, Casey was involved in an accident on a building site and suffered severe damage to one of his vertebral disc which required surgery in May 2018 and caused him to lose feeling in his fingers and forced him to be unable to play the bass during the band's shows until he fully healed. The band was unsure if Casey would be able to begin their 2018 summer tour due to the injury. However, Kevin Rheault, the band's longtime stage tech and who filled in for other band members in the past, filled in on bass at the band's live shows and has since become the band's official bassist on live shows as Casey plays bass only in studio and has since focused on co and lead vocal duties for the band especially with singer Al Barr on hiatus from the band since 2022.

During a St. Patrick's Day show at the House of Blues on March 17, 2019, Casey attempted to defend fans that were being attacked by another concert-goer. He was hit in the head by a beer can, causing blood to appear on his face, though he stayed on stage and finished the concert while the involved fan was escorted from the building.

In April 2021, Casey announced that he had returned to college at UMass to finish up his college degree which he started decades ago.

On June 24, 2021, Casey along with music artists Dionne Warwick, Sam Moore and Corey Glover appeared in Washington DC at the U.S. Capitol alongside congressmen Ted Deutch and Darrell Issa to help introduce the American Music Fairness Act which would help music performers and recorded-music copyright owners to be paid for airplay of their songs on AM/FM radio stations. The United States currently is the only major country in the world where radio pays no royalties to the performer or copyright owner and only to the songwriter of the song. Casey said, "I'm a punk rocker! We don't even want to be played on the radio, but I'm here in support of my fellow musicians. When other people are making millions and billions, well, I think the trickle down should be a little more equitable."

On May 28, 2025, Casey was part of a humanitarian aid convoy visit to Ukraine. "The band had started to do some T-shirts that were to raise money, 100% of the proceeds go to Ukrainian aid efforts and I just thought it was important to me that if I'm going to be speaking up and asking people to donate money I should actually show up and see things with my own eyes and be a part of it directly" Casey said.

Casey appeared on the Sing for Science podcast on June 12, 2025, where he discussed workers rights with Professor of Practice and Executive Director of the Center for Labor and a Just Economy at Harvard Law School, Sharon Block.

On September 25, 2025, Casey was honored with the Massachusetts Storyteller of the Year Award by the charitable organization Mass Humanities for a career defined by music, activism, and archival storytelling.

=== Bet with fan ===
On March 10, 2025, a video from the Dropkick Murphys' March 8, 2025 show in Clearwater, FL was uploaded by a fan on TikTok and Instagram. The video showed Casey stopping the band's show after spotting a fan in the crowd wearing a President Donald Trump MAGA T-shirt. It has been widely reported for years that despite the President claiming to want to bring more jobs to America, wanting to sell more American made products, his own merchandise for the most part is made in other countries. Casey said, "Dropkick Murphys proudly sells Made in America merchandise only. And here's the bet I'd like to make. If you lose the bet, we switch shirts, ok? If you win the bet, I give you 100 dollars and the shirt."

Casey was correct and it was revealed the fan's shirt was not American made and was made in Nicaragua. The fan lost the bet, removed his shirt and threw it to Casey on stage who gave the fan one of the band's T-shirts. Casey praised the fan for being a good sport, stating, "They were longtime fans who wanted to let us know they disagree with our politics, but they were respectful and after the concert the gentleman actually said, 'Dropkicks are family and I don't let politics come between family,' which I was pleasantly surprised by." According to social media and fans that were at the show, the man who was singled out was not the only person wearing MAGA merchandise. Some others were also wearing thin blue line pins and confederate flag pins. Casey said, "I say wear what you like, it's still somewhat of a free country for now...wear a MAGA shirt, dye your hair purple...whatever makes you happy." The video has since received media attention on Newsweek and has been viewed over 900,000 times on social media.

== Equipment ==
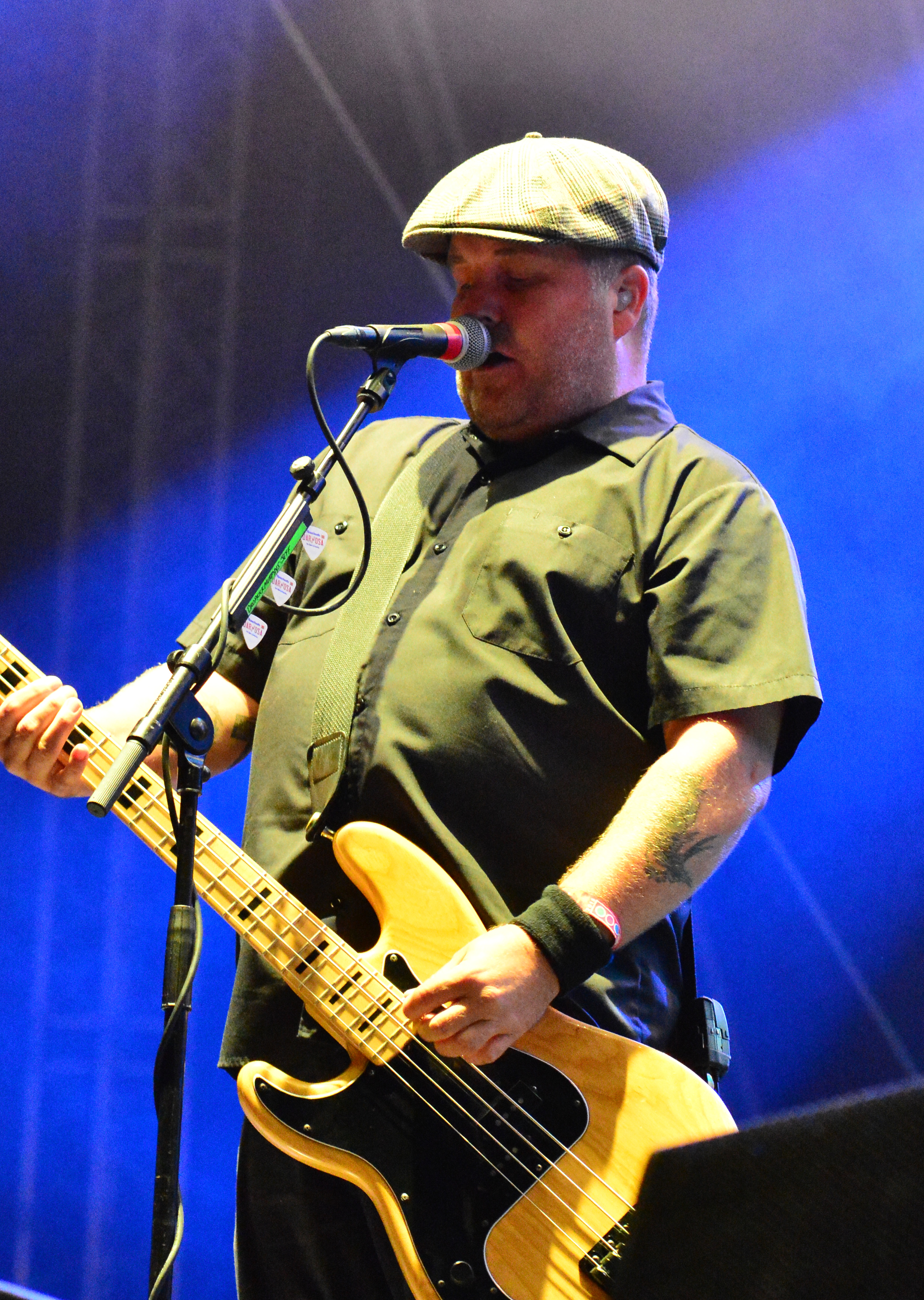
Casey performing in 2015

Being left-handed, Casey primarily plays left-handed Fender Precision Basses through Ampeg SVT bass amplifiers and cabinets with Dropkick Murphys, though he has been seen playing Fender Jazz Basses and, as of 2018, a Duesenberg Starplayer bass as well. He almost always plays with a pick and wears his bass lower than many players, explaining that when he first started playing, he cared more about his bass "being low and looking cool" than a proper strap length.

== Murphys Boxing ==
In 2015, Casey started the boxing promotion, Murphys Boxing. Casey has promoted various local fights in the Boston area which have also aired nationally on television. Danny O' Connor (ranked as one of the top 15 boxers in the world), Spike O'Sullivan, Logan McGuiness, Stephen Ormond and Michael McLaughlin currently fight for Casey's promotion. Casey said of his promotion "My grandfather was an avid boxing fan and an amateur boxer himself. He turned me onto the sport from about the age of three and the band has always had connections too. We have a song about John L. Sullivan (the bare-knuckle champion) and another one about Micky Ward (former WBU light-welterweight champion). But how I actually got into promoting was through my friend Danny O'Connor, who's a boxer from here. I was watching how hard it was for him – training in Texas, trying to sell tickets for his fights up here, he had a newborn baby and, like, how do you sell tickets when you're in Texas? I thought I'd just do some social media, promoting him to the Dropkicks fans, and the next thing you know is that five years later I'm immersed in boxing."

== Restaurants and bars ==
Casey was the owner of a sports bar in the Back Bay neighborhood of Boston on Boylston Street near Fenway Park, called McGreevy's, dedicated to the memory of the founder of the Royal Rooters, "'Nuf Ced" Michael T. McGreevy. On August 19, 2020, Casey announced that McGreevy's would be closing down after 12 years due to the economic fallout of the COVID-19 pandemic.

He was also part-owner (with Shawn Thornton and Tim Wakefield) of a Pembroke, Massachusetts restaurant called Turner's Yard, which closed in 2014.

Casey announced in December 2019 that he would be opening another restaurant, Yellow Door Taqueria, in Boston's South End. It opened in February 2020.
