= Black on Black: A Tribute to Black Flag =

- Cover of the original Initial Records release.

Compilation album by various artists
- Released: October 8, 2002
- Recorded: May 2001 to August 2002
- Genres: Hardcore punk, metalcore, mathcore
- Labels: Initial, ReIgnition

Alternative cover
- Cover of the 2006 ReIgnition Recordings version.

Black on Black: A Tribute to Black Flag is a tribute album to the American hardcore punk band Black Flag. The album, released through Initial Records on October 8, 2002, compiles covers which were originally released as a series of four 7-inch singles. After Initial Records went out of business in 2004, Black on Black was later reissued through ReIgnition Recordings on March 14, 2006, with six new cover songs.

== Reception ==
Professional ratings
Review scores
| Source | Rating |
|---|---|
| Allmusic (2002 version) | 3/5 stars |
| Punknews.org (2006 version) | 3.5/5 stars |

== Track listing ==
All songs originally written and recorded by Black Flag.

Initial Records version (2002)
| No. | Title | Artist | Length |
|---|---|---|---|
| 1. | "Depression" | American Nightmare | 2:18 |
| 2. | "Life of Pain" | Anodyne | 2:55 |
| 3. | "Drinking and Driving" | Burnt by the Sun | 3:15 |
| 4. | "Jealous Again" | Coalesce | 2:25 |
| 5. | "Annihilate This Week" | Converge | 4:18 |
| 6. | "Damaged, Parts I & II" | The Dillinger Escape Plan | 4:55 |
| 7. | "Nervous Breakdown" | The Hope Conspiracy | 1:56 |
| 8. | "Police Story/Wasted" | Planes Mistaken for Stars | 2:31 |
| 9. | "Six Pack" | Playing Enemy | 4:13 |

ReIgnition Recordings version (2006)
| No. | Title | Artist | Length |
|---|---|---|---|
| 1. | "Rise Above" | Most Precious Blood | 2:00 |
| 2. | "Black Coffee" | Zao | 4:20 |
| 3. | "My War" | Bleeding Through | 3:38 |
| 4. | "I've Heard It Before" | The Black Dahlia Murder | 1:45 |
| 5. | "Spray Paint the Walls" | Remembering Never | 0:38 |
| 6. | "Loose Nut" | Drowningman | 2:16 |
| 7. | "Depression" | American Nightmare | 2:18 |
| 8. | "Life of Pain" | Anodyne | 2:56 |
| 9. | "Drinking and Driving" | Burnt by the Sun | 3:16 |
| 10. | "Jealous Again" | Coalesce | 2:25 |
| 11. | "Annihilate This Week" | Converge | 4:19 |
| 12. | "Damaged, Parts I & II" | The Dillinger Escape Plan | 4:57 |
| 13. | "Nervous Breakdown" | The Hope Conspiracy | 1:57 |
| 14. | "Police Story/Wasted" | Planes Mistaken for Stars | 2:32 |
| 15. | "Six Pack" | Playing Enemy | 4:13 |

== Personnel ==
- John A. – guitar
- Kurt Ballou – producer, engineer, mixing
- Dean Baltulonis – engineer
- Brian Benoit – guitar
- Tim Cossar – producer
- Demian – backing vocals
- John Golden – mastering
- Jason Hellmann – photography
- Mike Hill – guitar, vocals
- The Hope Conspiracy – mixing
- Scott C. Kinkade – photography
- John McKaig – photography
- Mickey O – vocals
- Teddy P. – bass
- Ryan Patterson – liner notes, layout design
- Chris Pennie – drums
- Chris Pierce – engineer
- Matt Pike – booking
- Playing Enemy – producer
- Greg Puciato – vocals
- Ed Rose – engineer
- Josh Scott – bass
- Joel Stallings – drums
- Ben Weinman – guitar
- Liam Wilson – bass
- Jacob Bannon – vocals
