= Lights Out (Fall River album) =

Studio album by Fall River
- Released: November 8, 2005
- Studio: Black Lodge Studios (Eudora, Kansas); Valencia Studios (Brookville, Maryland)
- Genre: Hardcore punk; metalcore; mathcore
- Length: 25:41
- Label: Thorp
- Producer: Simon Brody

Fall River chronology
Chronicles (2005)	Lights Out (2005)

Lights Out is the only studio album by American hardcore punk band Fall River, released on November 8, 2005, through Thorp Records. It was produced by Simon Brody of Drowningman and mixed by Matt Bayles. A music video was produced for the track "The President Has Been Kidnapped by Ninjas".

== Background and recording ==
After the release of Chronicles, the group signed into Thorp Records on May 31, 2005. Before heading into the studio, the band showcased some new material at a handful of shows around the Syracuse area with Bury Your Dead, The Red Chord, Between the Buried and Me, and others. Then they'll head to Hellfest where plans are being set to have Sean Ingram join them on stage live and attended Warped Tour.

They entered the studio in July where they met Simon Brody of Drowningman, Paul Leavitt (All Time Low, Cute Is What We Aim For, The Bled), Alan Douches (Converge, Every Time I Die), Matt Bayles (The Blood Brothers, These Arms Are Snakes, Mastodon), Sons of Nero (Unearth, Zao, The Dillinger Escape Plan) and Sean Ingram of Coalesce who all help make the album. The effort was released on November 8, 2005.

A music video was produced for the track "The President Has Been Kidnapped by Ninjas".

In May 2006, Fall River announced that the band was disbanding due to "financial, creative and personal differences." The last show was originally slated for June 9 until it was pushed back, they played their last show on June 23, 2006, at Quakertown, Pennsylvania.

== Reception ==
Professional ratings
Review scores
Source	Rating
Antimusic	3.5/5 stars
Invisible Oranges	Positive
Neufutur	5.7/10
Punk News	2.5/5 stars
Scene Point Blank	3/5 stars
Sister Hood	Positive

Lights Out was met with mixed to positive reviews by many outlets. Invisible Oranges noted Bellvance's vocal work as "one of the most crushing female vocal performances I've heard." Not all is pleased with the effort, Punknews stated in their review that the album was "far less impressive than what Fall River is seemingly capable of." They also called the album "a collective of new-school metalcore acts lifting riffs and the general flow from the (should-be) legendary Seattle outfit and adding insufficient ideas of their own necessary to give it that unique flavor."

Neufutur described the album "to end a track that has placed them all over the musical map, with mostly impressive results." Scene Point Blank criticized the effort saying, "The recording is rather lackluster, seems to have an absence of balls, and is rather sterile sounding."

Antimusic reported that "Lights Out is definitely not a call to fall asleep. Frenetic, angry, and a little schizoid, the whole bloody affair comes across as the next step in hardcore's evolution."

== Track listing ==
All tracks are written by Fall River.

No.	Title	Length
1.	"My Heart, The Beegar"	3:05
2.	"The President Has Been Kidnapped by Ninjas"	3:01
3.	"I'm Not a Big Fan of Parentheses (Burn Baby, Burn)"	1:39
4.	"If We Knew Then What We Know Now"	3:34
5.	"The Boards"	0:46
6.	"Cash Out"	2:49
7.	"This Room's a Revolution"	4:17
8.	"Dead Ends and U-Turns"	3:29
9.	"Hands in the Air"	2:23
10.	"DNA of a Liar"	2:33
Total length:		25:41

== Personnel ==
Fall River

- Alison Bellavance – Vocals
- Kevin Rausch – Guitar
- Matt Boylan – Bass
- John Collier – Drums

Technical personnel

- Sean Ingram (of Coalesce) – Additional vocals (track 3)
- Paul Leavitt – Engineer and recording
- Simon Brody (of Drowningman) – Engineer and producer
- Alan Douches – Mastering
- Matt Bayles – Mixing
- Aaron Marsh (of Sons of Nero Designs) – Artwork and layout
- Rob Dobi – Photography
