= Bombs Away =

Bombs Away may refer to:

== Books, Film and TV ==
- Bombs Away: The Story of a Bomber Team, a 1942 nonfiction book by John Steinbeck
- "Bombs Away" (Happy Hollidays), a 2009 television episode
- "Bombs Away", an episode of American television series NYPD Blue (Season 2)

== Music ==
- Bombs Away (group), electro artists, 2010
- Bombs Away (album), 2014 album by Sheppard

=== Songs ===
- "Bombs Away", a song on the 1978 album Heaven Help the Fool by Bob Weir
- "Bombs Away", a song on the 1989 album Cruel, Crazy Beautiful World by Johnny Clegg and Savuka
- "Bombs Away", a song on the 1984 album Glorious Results of a Misspent Youth by Joan Jett and the Blackhearts
- "Bombs Away", a song on the 2004 album Like You Like an Arsonist by the band Paris, Texas
- "Bombs Away", a song on the 2006 album The War Back Home by The Ducky Boys
- "Bombs Away", a song on the 1995 album When God Dies by Uncle Slam
- "Bombs Away", a song on the 2007 album Win Us Over by ASG
- "Bombs Away", a song on the 1980 album Zenyatta Mondatta by The Police
- "Bombs Away", a song on the 1995 album Hoss by Lagwagon
- "Bombs Away", a song on the 2011 album Future History by Jason Derulo
- "Bombs Away", a song on the 2012 album Strange Clouds by B.o.B. featuring actor Morgan Freeman
- "Bombs Away", a song on the 2014 album Wonderful, Glorious by Eels
- "Bombs Away", a song on the 2017 album Ambitions by One Ok Rock
