= Serenity (Blood for Blood album) =

Studio album by Blood for Blood
- Released: June 22, 2004
- Studio: The Outpost (Stoughton, Massachusetts)
- Genre: Hardcore punk
- Length: 16:47
- Label: Thorp
- Producer: Rob Lind; Jim Siegal

Blood for Blood chronology
Outlaw Anthems (2002)	Serenity (2004)

Serenity is the fifth studio album by American hardcore punk band Blood for Blood, released on June 22, 2004, via Thorp Records. It was produced by Jim Siegel and Rob Lind and is the last release from Blood for Blood as they went hiatus the same year.

== Background and recording ==
After signing into Thorp Records, the band entered the studio and started recording new songs. There was originally ten songs and was originally slated for a spring release until being pushed back to summer. The album cover features a building in the Bunker Hill Housing Development. It is the largest housing project in the City of Boston, and it is located in Rob Lind's home neighborhood of Charlestown.

The CD includes 20 minutes of exclusive Blood for Blood enhanced video footage spanning the bands extensive history, the development of the band, the making of Serenity, the writing process and more.

== Reception ==
Professional ratings
Review scores
Source	Rating
AllMusic	4/5 stars
Sputnikmusic	4/5 stars
Lambgoat	8/10
PunkNews.org	3/5 stars
Aversion Online	Positive
FUZE Magazine	7/10
Instrife	2/4 stars

The album was met with positive reviews, Rick Anderson of AllMusic said that the band "manage to deliver a full program of hardcore that covers a wide range of emotions while staying pretty firmly inside the conventional boundaries of the genre." They also mention the videos as well "the CD-ROM segment includes an excellent documentary film about the band and the making of Serenity."

Sputnikmusic wrote their review four after the release and declares the effort "a very well put together hardcore album reminiscent of the dirty days of hardcore, which seems to have fallen wayward recently." They close the review with a look back to the band's legacy "Its intention was to offer both a fitting end to the Blood For Blood "legacy" and to put together some well-written songs, which it one hundred percent accomplished."

Cory of Lambgoat mentions "each song plays like an address to a different group of oppressed and despondent people, with the ultimate message being that there is, in fact, someone who cares and that someone appears to be Blood For Blood." They end the review with "another mark on the band's near-flawless record of great hardcore."

Sam of PunkNews.org was mixed, they enjoyed the beginning of the album "hangin' on the Corner" is an awesome song." Unfortunately it seems it had lost on them "sadly, with only 7 tracks, two of which are practically the same 30-second song. Kind of a mediocre release."

Aversion Online had high expectations and was impressed with the songs, they said that it "hits like a ton of bricks and offers up some of the band's strongest and most diverse material to date."

Instrife was mixed with the album, they said that it's a "fun record with many sing-along opportunities." Despite that, they thought it was lacking compared to the band's previous discography "definitely not BFB's greatest. Long time fans will probably get this no matter what I say but the casual fan should skip to better, older releases."

== Track listing ==
All tracks are written by Rob Lind except track 7, written by Del Shannon and Max Crook

No.	Title	Length
1.	"A Prayer to the Night Sky"	0:30
2.	"Serenity"	0:23
3.	"Hanging on the Corner"	3:11
4.	"Live the Lie"	0:57
5.	"A Rock 'n' Roll Song"	2:49
6.	"My Jesus Mercy"	2:26
7.	"Runaway" (Del Shannon cover)	2:20
8.	"City Boy"	2:28
9.	"Serenity (Reprise)"	1:39
Total length:		16:47

Videos

- The Road to Serenity – 17:34
- Caruba – 2:29
- Out Takes – 3:16

== Personnel ==
Blood for Blood

- Rob Lind – guitar and vocals
- Erick Medina – vocals
- Ian McFarland – bass
- Neal Dike – drums

Technical personnel

- Jim Siegel – producer, engineer and mixing
- John Cohan – drum technician
- Orion Landau – design

Additional personnel

- Wasted Youth Crew – backing vocals
