= I Can't Believe My Eyes =

I Can't Believe My Eyes may refer to:

- "I Can't Believe My Eyes", a song by Arthur Adams from the album It's Private Tonight, 1973
- "I Can't Believe My Eyes", a song by Russell Hitchcock from the album Russell Hitchcock, 1988
- "I Can't Believe My Eyes", a song by Andrew Peterson from the album Walk, 1996
- "I Can't Believe My Eyes", a song by Down to Nothing from the albums Splitting Headache and Unbreakable, 2005
