= Hell Within =

American metalcore band

- Also known as: Twytch
- Origin: Lowell, Massachusetts, U.S.
- Genre: Metalcore
- Years active: 1998–2011, 2015
- Labels: Thorp, Lifeforce
- Members: Matthew McChesney; Isaias "Zay" Martinez; Tony Zimmerman; Philip J. Sica; Mike Zaker

Hell Within was an American metalcore band formed in Lowell, Massachusetts, in 1998. After recording two albums as Twytch, the band changed their name to Hell Within and released Asylum of the Human Predator through Lifeforce Records in 2005. After extensive touring across the United States and lineup changes, the band released Shadows of Vanity in 2007. Hell Within released God Grant Me Vengeance in 2010 and was previously signed to Thorp Records. They disbanded in 2011 and reunited for a one-off show in 2015.

== History ==
=== 1998–2003 ===
Hell Within began when vocalist Matt McChesney joined the band Twytch in 2002.

=== 2003–2005 ===
At this time, European metal label Lifeforce Records was seeking to sign bands under their new American branch. After much regional success, Twytch's album Hatred found its way into the hands of Lifeforce German rep Stefan Ludicke, who offered the band a recording contract.

By now, the band had outgrown the name Twytch and wanted something more original and heavy-sounding. They agreed on the name Hell Within. In an interview with Decibel Magazine, the band discusses what led to the name change.

In April 2005, Hell Within's first worldwide release, Asylum of the Human Predator, was delivered. First print editions contained a DVD of behind-the-scenes video of the band on tour. These have sold out, are now sought after by collectors.

The album's lead single was "Bleeding Me Black." An accompanying music video was produced by Ian McFarland of Killswitch Productions.

On July 22, 2005, the opening track from Asylum of the Human Predator, "Godspeed to Your Deathbed," reached No. 1 on the Comcast Music Choice network, beating out such bands as Nevermore, As I Lay Dying and A Life Once Lost.

In the fall of 2005, Hell Within embarked on the International Extreme Music Festival tour with bands such as Nightrage, Atrocity, Leaves' Eyes, Lilitu, Manntis and God Dethroned. During the tour Hell Within played to audiences all across North America in places such as the legendary CBGB in New York City.

=== 2006–Present ===
After returning from the IEMF tour, Hell Within went through several changes, not only in the band lineup, but musically as well. Longtime drummer Bubba Joyce resigned, and was replaced by Derek Jay, formerly of Trauma Concept.

In the fall of 2006, production on Hell Within's second album Shadows of Vanity went underway. It was at this time that creative differences between the members became apparent. Making matters confusing was that vocalist Matt McChesney did guest vocals on The Autumn Offering's new album, since they were without a vocalist at the time. Rumors were swirling amongst fans that McChesney was no longer in Hell Within. On June 24, 2007, as production was wrapping up on Shadows of Vanity, McChesney released an even more bewildering statement to blabbermouth.net: "I'm devoting 100% of my time, for the immediate future, to The Autumn Offering. I am not leaving Hell Within." However, the damage was done. Hell Within found a new vocalist and publicly introduced Brian Roy on July 16, 2007.

Sensing that the screaming style of vocals was a trend and wishing to jump on a new bandwagon, Hell Within decided to embark upon a throwback sound reminiscent of late 80's thrash. Reviews for Shadows of Vanity were generally good. The album was produced by John Ellis and mixed by Mark Lewis of AudioHammer Studios (Trivium, Bury Your Dead, God Forbid.) Tartarean Desire claimed the album was "... a breath of fresh air... With amazing solos, tight and insane music." A tour in 2008 included support acts such as Deathbeat and Sikend, both of whom were fans of Hell Within for years.

In October 2009, Hell Within announced that they had signed with Thorp Records and would be releasing a new album in the Spring 2010. Hell Within headlined the "Scars in Oblivion Tour 2010" with Long Island metalcore act Letter to the Exiles (Strike First Records), a six-week full-US tour leading up to the July 13 release of their new album "God Grant Me Vengeance".

In 2011, it was announced that Hell Within would be breaking up, with their last show taking place on November 11 in their hometown of Lowell.

Hell Within reunited for a live show in 2015 to celebrate the 10-year anniversary of Asylum Of The Human Predator.

== Current lineup ==
- Isaias "Zay" Martinez- guitar
- Tony Zimmerman – guitar
- Derek Jay – drums

== Former members ==
- Brian "Kowski" Marcinkowski – vocals (* on TWYTCH 4 Song Demo & 2001 EP)
- John Chaisson – vocals (* on TWYTCH 3 Song Demo)
- Bubba Joyce – drums
- JJ Long – vocals
- Derek Garabedian – bass
- Joe Martinez – bass
- Phil Gauthier – bass (* on All TWYTCH releases except "Hatred")

== Discography ==
- TWYTCH (3 song demo) (1998)
- TWYTCH (4 song demo) (1999)
- TWYTCH (EP) (2001)
- Hatred (EP) (2003)
- Asylum of the Human Predator (2005)
- Shadows of Vanity (2007)
- God Grant Me Vengeance (2010)
