= Prey (Planes Mistaken for Stars album) =

Studio album by Planes Mistaken for Stars
- Released: October 21, 2016
- Studio: Earth Analog Studios
- Genres: Heavy metal, hardcore punk, post-hardcore
- Length: 36:25
- Label: Deathwish (DW193)
- Producer: Sanford Parker

Planes Mistaken for Stars chronology
We Ride to Fight! (2007)	Prey (2016)

Prey is the fourth studio album by American rock band Planes Mistaken for Stars. Following the band's 2008 breakup and their 2010 sporadic return to touring, Prey marks the band's first release since the compilation album We Ride to Fight! (2007) and first release of new material since Mercy (2006). The album was released on October 21, 2016, through Deathwish Inc. who also reissued and remastered Mercy the previous year. The album debuted at number 12 at Billboard Heatseeksers.

== Background and writing ==
Following the release of what was then-known as their final album Mercy in 2006, frontman Gared O'Donnell wanted to put his music and touring days behind him to start a family and lead a more stable life. After a few years, O'Donnell says he went through a "pre-midlife crisis" and grew to miss being in a traveling band. Feeling that he couldn't concentrate in his home with his family and home office as possible distractions, O'Donnell drive around for four hours and ended up at a Motel Six in Waukegan, Illinois—a couple hundred miles away from his house. The idea to travel for creative inspiration came from writers such as Jack Kerouac and John Steinbeck.

However, the trip wasn't as fruitful as he hoped it would be. O'Donnell drove around aimlessly hoping to find a quaint Midwest American town surrounded by nature, but Waukegan didn't offer what he sought. Of the trip, he said: "That ended up being a hot shit show. I grabbed all these receipts and napkins and stuff that I'd written little ideas on. It was so fragmented, and I thought I'd get the fuck out of here and do some Jack Kerouac thing, drive around the country. But I'm forty. I'm not a 22–year-old Beat poet." In addition to the setting not feeling right, O'Donnell was used to writing music with other people and found it difficult to take over sole writing duties. He reached out to Planes Mistaken for Stars' original bassist Aaron Wise (who only appeared on their debut self-titled EP). Wise ultimately told O'Donnell to return to his family. O'Donnell said: "He came out and we had a couple adventures, and then he was like, 'It sounds like you just need to go home and focus on clearing your head and being with your family.' In doing so, I figured out what the theme was for the record: waking up. Waking up and learning to tackle things head on."

Most of the music on Prey stemmed from ideas O'Donnell had in his head since Planes Mistaken for Stars broke up, and he describes the sound as "Thin Lizzy crossed with Sugar."

== Reception ==
Professional ratings
Review scores
Source	Rating
Metal Hammer	3.5/5 stars
PopMatters	8/10 stars
Punknews.org	4.5/5 stars
SLUG Magazine	(positive)

Upon release, Prey was met with generally favorable reviews from music critics. Writing for the New York Observer, Ari Rosenschein wrote: "Rivaling the best of the group's catalog, Prey is absolutely unrelenting, and it's also Planes Mistaken for Stars' most eclectic release yet, drawing from '70s rockers Thin Lizzy and ZZ Top as much as Chicago underground legends Pegboy and Naked Raygun. Angry, caged and confused, the album is like a futurist Funhouse: a dense joyride where Slint sidles up to Sisters of Mercy in the backseat."

== Track listing ==
No.	Title	Length
1.	"Dementia Americana"	1:34
2.	"Til' It Clicks"	5:05
3.	"Riot Season"	2:43
4.	"Fucking Tenderness"	3:42
5.	"She Who Steps"	4:50
6.	"Clean Up Mean – 3:20"	3:20
7.	"Black Rabbit – 2:00"	2:00
8.	"Pan in Flames – 4:05"	4:05
9.	"Enemy Blinds – 3:49"	3:49
10.	"Alabaster Cello"	5:17

== Personnel ==
Prey personnel adapted from CD liner notes.

=== Planes Mistaken for Stars ===
- Gared O'Donnell
- Mike Ricketts
- Chuck French
- Neil Keener
- Aaron Wise

=== Additional musicians ===
- Keith Cone – additional vocals
- Sanford Parker – additional vocals
- Rebecca Lux – additional vocals
- Loki O'Donnell – additional vocals

=== Production ===
- Sanford Parker – production, recording

=== Artwork ===
- Camille Shotliff – artwork
- Jacob Bannon – additional art, design
