= Three Chords and the Truth (The Ducky Boys album) =

Studio album by The Ducky Boys
- Released: November 16, 2004
- Studio: The Outpost (Stoughton, Massachusetts)
- Genre: Punk
- Length: 36:30
- Label: Thorp
- Producer: Jim Siegel

The Ducky Boys chronology
Dark Days (1998)	Three Chords and the Truth (2004)	The War Back Home (2006)

Three Chords and the Truth is the third studio album by American street punk band The Ducky Boys. It released on November 16, 2004 via Thorp Records and was produced and mixed by Jim Siegel.

The group reverted to a three piece band with a big, professional recorded sound for the album. This is the Ducky Boy's second album with Thorp Records and their first with guitarist Douglas Sullivan.

== Background and recording ==
The band was writing new songs until being approached by Thorp Records who signed them on July 9, 2004. On the same post, they announced that the group is currently recording a new full-length at the Outpost and the effort was expected to release in November that year.

They finished recording in August and announced that Jim Siegel was attach to the effort, finishing the news with a November 16 date.

== Reception ==
Professional ratings
Review scores
Source	Rating
PunkNews.org	4/5 stars
Aversion Online	3.5/5 stars
Lambgoat	8/10

The album was met with positive review, Cory of Lambgoat had high expectations and noted that "every song features a great sing-along chorus, a strong (and often slightly familiar) melody and lyrics that expose the sensitive side of the "tough guy" life." They continue with "the well-executed gang-style vocals and handclaps always bolster the already powerful vocal delivery." They ended the review with "three Chords and the Truth consists of sixteen catchy punk rock anthems penned by a band good enough to appeal to even the most jaded audience."

PunkNews.org reviewer Adam White was impressed with the songs, noting an "incredibly enjoyable slab of catchy, propulsive rock'n'roll. Like the title says The Ducky Boys stick to conventional punk song structures but they effortlessly execute big memorable hooks like few others." He finishes the reflection with "an earnest and extremely amiable collection of punk tunes."

Aversion Online also had high expectations and praise that the songs are "memorable without being too overtly melodic in some respects, keeping things short but sweet." They were very pleased with the album, concluding that "it's a damn enjoyable listen."

== Track listing ==
All tracks are written by Mark Lind except where noted.

No.	Title	Writer(s)	Length
1.	"Boston, USA"		1:36
2.	"Pass You By"		1:43
3.	"Alone Tonight"	Mark Lind; Douglas Sullivan	1:50
4.	"Scars"	Lind; Caniris; Rob Lind; Felix Pappalardo	3:05
5.	"Fight"	Lind; Jason Messina	1:41
6.	"For the Underdogs"	Lind; Dan O'Leary	2:17
7.	"Stand By Me"	Ben E. King	2:53
8.	"Hanging On"		2:01
9.	"This Place"		2:10
10.	"The Long Road"	Lind; Messina	2:21
11.	"Ain't It a Shame"		2:15
12.	"Untitled"		2:05
13.	"Break Me"		2:19
14.	"Looking Back"	Lind; Sullivan	1:34
15.	"Richmond Skyline"	Lind; Sullivan	2:44
16.	"Crumbling Heart"	Lind; Messina	3:56
Total length:			36:30

== Personnel ==
The Ducky Boys

- Mark Lind – vocals and bass
- Douglas Sullivan – guitar and vocals
- Jason Messina – drums and vocals

Additional performers

- Zack Brines – organs (track 7)
- James SK Wān – slide whistle

Technical personnel

- Jim Siegel – producer, engineer and mixing
- Jeff Lipton – mastering
- Orion Landau – layout
