= Unbreakable (Down to Nothing album) =

Studio album by Down to Nothing
- Released: February 19, 2008
- Genre: Hardcore punk
- Label: Revelation Records

Down to Nothing chronology
| The Most (2007) | Unbreakable (2008) | All My Sons (2010) |

Unbreakable is the fourth release by straight edge hardcore punk band Down to Nothing. It was released on February 19, 2008. The album is mainly a composition of recorded material prior to the band's 2007 album The Most, mostly composed by re-recorded tracks of their first two studio albums Save It for the Birds and Splitting Headache.

== Track listing ==
1. Save It for the Birds 1:09
2. One Eighty 1:48
3. The Normal People 1:53
4. Outcome 2:28
5. Choke Louder 1:09
6. 3 or 4 Years :44
7. Pet Peeve :29
8. Who Are You to Say 1:58
9. Honorable Mention Mr. Starky 2:15
10. What Goes Around Comes Around 2:53
11. Fire Escape 3:18
12. Go Ahead wit Yo' Fake Ass :51
13. Us v Each Other 1:49
14. I Can't Believe My Eyes 2:29
15. Smash It :54
16. Burn III 1:55
17. Unbreakable 2:22
18. Home Sweet Home 1:40
19. We're on the Run 1:53
20. Risk It :56
21. Skate & Annoy, Vol. 2.0 (Sk8 or Die) :11
22. I'm So Lucky 4:20

== Personnel ==
Production

- Gary Llama – recording (Tracks 18–22)

== Reception ==
Punknews.org said the album's that the tracks were taken off from and the album itself was "still a solid listen and a handy way to scope the band's back catalog."
