= Asylum of the Human Predator =

Studio album by Hell Within
- Released: April 19, 2005 (U.S.)
- Recorded: November 2004
- Genre: Metalcore
- Length: 39:52
- Label: Lifeforce Records
- Producers: Hell Within and John Ellis

Hell Within chronology
Asylum of the Human Predator (2005)	Shadows of Vanity (2007)

Asylum of the Human Predator is the first studio album by American metalcore band Hell Within.

The first single off the album was "Bleeding Me Black". An accompanying music video was produced by Ian McFarland of Killswitch Productions. The video features the band playing in a warehouse, interspersed with shots of a young man who discovers his girlfriend is cheating on him. At the end of the video, the young man ties up his girlfriend's new boyfriend, and lights him on fire.

On July 22, 2005, the opening track from Asylum of the Human Predator, "Godspeed to Your Deathbed", reached #1 on the Comcast Music Choice network, beating out such bands as Nevermore, As I Lay Dying and A Life Once Lost.

First print editions of Asylum of the Human Predator contained a DVD of behind-the-scenes video of the band on tour. These have sold out and are now sought after by collectors.

== Track listing ==
1. "Godspeed to Your Deathbed"
2. "Bleeding Me Black"
3. "Redemption... Is a Cold Body"
4. "Merchants of the Blood Trade"
5. "A World to Murder"
6. "Self-Inflicted Silence"
7. "Asylum of the Human Predator"
8. "Soul Revulsion"
9. "Swallow the Stitches"
10. "Open Eyes to Open Wounds"

== Personnel ==
- Matthew McChesney – vocals
- Isaias "Zay" Martinez- guitar
- Tony Zimmerman – guitar
- Joe Martinez – bass
- Bubba Joyce – drums
