= Fall River (band) =

American hardcore punk band

- Also known as: Manhunt
- Origin: Souderton, Pennsylvania, U.S.
- Genres: Sasscore; mathcore
- Years active: 1997–2003, 2003–2006, 2013
- Labels: Teishu; Emerald Moon; Thorp
- Past members: Jason Hedrick; Mike Reese; Dan Piston; Alison Bellavance; John Collier; Kevin Rausch; Matt Boylan

Fall River was an American hardcore punk band formed in Souderton, Pennsylvania, early 2003 after the break-up of their first project, Manhunt. The group mainly consisted of four members: vocalist Alison Bellavance, drummer John Collier, guitarist Kevin Rausch, and bassist Matt Boylan.

They spent their first year in Kevin's garage and eventually they put some songs together and they released a 4-song demo tape (2000). They released their debut EP Revenge: Volume One (2001) and later signed into Teishu Records. The band released the second EP They Follow, I Fly (2002).

The original band had to split and Bellavance, Rausch, Collier, and Piston formed a spiritual successor named Fall River on February 6, 2003. The group released a short three track demo (2003) that has sold over 2,000 copies and later resigned into Teishu Records.

After the signing, Fall River released their debut EP 2448724 (2004). The band signed into Emerald Moon Records and released their second EP Chronicles on (2005) and appeared on the Masters of Horror soundtrack. The band signed into Thorp Records and released their debut studio album Lights Out (2005).

In May 2006, they announced that the band was disbanding due to "financial, creative and personal differences.” On June 26, 2013, the band made a reunion show with Every Time I Die.

== History ==
=== 1997–2003: early years, Revenge: Volume One, and They Follow, I Fly ===
Fall River was formed in Souderton, Pennsylvania, in 1997 and they were originally called "Manhunt." The original members were Vocalist Alison Bellavance, drummer Mike Reese, lead guitarist Kevin Rausch, and backing guitarist John Collier. Collier and Rausch were friends from Middle School, Collier met Bellavance from local shows from a band that Bellevance used to play called Addle Girl. Collier introduced Bellevance to Rausch and Reese and formed Manhunt. They spent their first year in Kevin's garage and eventually they put some songs together and decided they needed to play a show. They hosted and played their first shows in Telford Borough Hall and after a few months, Manhunt released a 4-song demo tape in January 2000 with 500 copies and attracted attention to the small band. In June 2001, they released their debut EP Revenge: Volume One, the EP received praise from many outlets and later signed into Teishu Records. On March 19, 2002, they released the second EP They Follow, I Fly. and on March 26, 2002, the band performed at Club Krome, South Amboy, New Jersey with Coalesce, Burnt By The Sun, and The Esoteric. Manhunt did an interview with the University of Massachusetts Dartmouth on April 21, 2002.

Unfortunately, the band had to split up due to personal issues and held their last show at Telford Borough Hall, February 1, 2003. After the break up, Bellavance, Rausch, Collier and a new member Dan Piston who was friends with Collier decided to form a new band to serve as a continuation to Manhunt and on February 6, 2003, formed Fall River. Since 3 of its 4 members had over five years of experience under the band's belt, they began working on material and playing shows almost immediately, Collier switched to drums. The group released a short three track demo on December 19, 2003, that has sold over 2,000 copies and later resigned into Teishu Records.

=== 2004–2005: 2448724, Chronicles and Lights Out ===
After signing into Teishu Records, the band released their debut EP 2448724 on January 27, 2004, the EP was named after the band's friend, Matthew Baker. Piston left on September 11, 2004, and Mitch Martinez from Forever I Burn had to temporarily fill in. The band found a permanent bassist, Matt Boylan on January 1, 2005. The band signed into Emerald Moon Records and with the effort of Alan Douches (Converge, Every Time I Die) and Evan Williams, re-released the band's previous songs and a bonus unreleased track, into one complete package called Chronicles on March 22, 2005. After the release of Chronicles, the group caught the eyes of Thorp Records and signed into them on May 31, 2005. Before heading into the studio, the band showcased some of the new material at a handful of shows around the Syracuse area with Bury Your Dead, The Red Chord, Between the Buried and Me, and others.

After that they headed to the 2005 Hellfest, where Sean Ingram of Coalesce joined them live on stage and they also attended Warped Tour. They entered the studio in July where they met Simon Brody of Drowningman, Paul Leavitt (All Time Low, Cute Is What We Aim For, The Bled), Alan Douches, Matt Bayles (The Blood Brothers, These Arms Are Snakes, Mastodon), Sean Ingram, and Sons of Nero (Unearth, Zao, The Dillinger Escape Plan) who all help make the album. The album Lights Out was released on November 8, 2005, and despite the effort, the album received mixed reviews. A music video was produced for the track "The President Has Been Kidnapped By Ninjas."

Before the release of their debut album, Fall River Appeared in the Masters of Horror soundtrack on October 18, 2005, on Immortal Records alongside other bands such as Murder by Death, Mudvayne, Norma Jean, Funeral for a Friend, Andrew W.K. and more. They used a remastered track from their Chronicles EP “At Least You Gave You Flowers.”

=== 2006–2013: disbandment, other projects and 2013 reunion ===
In May 2006, Fall River announced that the band was disbanding due to "financial, creative and personal differences.” The last show was originally slated for June 9 until it was pushed back, they played their last show on June 23, 2006, at Quakertown, Pennsylvania.

Despite the band's break up, Alison Bellavance formed a new band with Matt Boylan and Matt Hall called Spark Is a Diamond right after the break up. On June 26, 2013, the band made a reunion show with Every Time I Die, My America Is Watching Tigers Die, and Girlfight at Montana West, Quakertown Pennsylvania.

== Band members ==
- Alison Bellavance – vocals (1997–2006, 2013)
- John Collier – drums (1997–2006, 2013)
- Kevin Rausch – guitar (1997–2006, 2013)
- Jason Hedrick – bass (1999–2001)
- Matt Boylan – bass (2005–2006, 2013)
- Mike Reese – drums (1997–2003)
- Dan Piston – bass (2003–2004)

== Discography ==
Studio albums

- Lights Out (2005)

Extended plays

- 4-Songs Demo Tape (2000)
- Revenge: Volume One (2001)
- They Follow, I Fly (2002)
- Three Track Demo (2003)
- 2448724 (2004)
- Chronicles (2005)
