= Three Chords and the Truth =

Three Chords and the Truth may refer to:

- "Three Chords and the Truth", an oft-quoted phrase coined by Harlan Howard in the 1950s which he used to describe country music
- Three Chords and the Truth, a 1997 book by Laurence Leamer about the business and lifestyle of country music and its many stars
- Three Chords & the Truth, a radio show hosted by Duff McKagan and Susan Holmes McKagan.

== Albums ==
- Three Chords and the Truth (Sara Evans album), a 1997 album
- Three Chords and the Truth (The Ducky Boys album), 2004
- Three Chords & the Truth (Van Morrison album), 2019
- Three Chords and the Truth, an album by James King, 2013
- 3 Chords & the Truth, a 2004 album by Anthony David

== Songs ==
- "Three Chords and the Truth" (song), a 1997 song by Sara Evans
- "Three Chords and the Truth", a song by John McCutcheon from his 2018 album, Trolling for Dreams
- "Three Chords and the Truth", a song by Ry Cooder from his 2007 album, My Name Is Buddy
- "Three Chords & the Truth", a Chase Rice song from his 2017 album Lambs & Lions

== See also ==
- Three Chords and a Half Truth, a 2013 album by Face to Face
