= All My Sons (disambiguation) =

All My Sons may refer to:

- All My Sons, a 1947 play by Arthur Miller
- All My Sons (film), a 1948 film based on the play of the same name
- All My Sons, a 2010 album by Down to Nothing
