= Dark Days =

Dark Days or Dark Day may refer to:

In film:

- Dark Day (1961 film), a South Korean film starring Kim Seung-ho
- Dark Days (film), a 2000 documentary by Marc Singer

In literature:

- Dark Days (comics), a comic book series by Steve Niles and Ben Templesmith
- Skulduggery Pleasant: Dark Days, a novel by Derek Landy
- Dark Days (Cheekati Rojulu), a novel by Ampasayya Naveen

In music:

- Dark Days (Coal Chamber album)
- Dark Days (The Ducky Boys album)
- Dark Days (Loaded album)
- Dark Day (Qwel & Maker album)
- Dark Day (Fred Anderson album)
- "Dark Days" (The Used song), a song by The Used
- Dark Day, a band led by Robin Crutchfield
- "Dark Days" (Parkway Drive song)
- "Dark Days" (Local Natives song)
- "Dark Days", a song by Fitz and the Tantrums from All the Feels

Other:

- New England's Dark Day, May 19, 1780, when the sky over New England was enveloped in darkness
