= The Ducky Boys =

American street punk band

- Origin: Boston, Massachusetts, U.S.
- Genres: Street punk; punk rock
- Years active: 1995–present
- Labels: State Line; Sailor's Grave; Thorp; Flat; GMM; I Scream
- Members: Mark Lind; Jason Messina; Douglas Sullivan; Rich Crimlisk
- Past members: Mike Marsden; James Lynch; Mike O'Leary
- Website: duckyboys.com

The Ducky Boys are an American street punk band from Boston. Since forming in 1995 in the Charlestown neighborhood of Boston, the band has released six full-length albums and over 80 songs. The band's name is derived from the name of an Irish street gang in the 1979 movie, The Wanderers.

Since 2004, the band has been composed of frontman Mark Lind (bass guitar and vocals), drummer Jason Messina, and guitarist Douglas Sullivan. The Ducky Boys have released five studio albums (the last three from this current line-up) along with several 7-inch records and appearances on compilations. Rich Crimlisk joined the band in 2012 and played on the Chemicals EP as well as the sixth studio album.

Over the last ten years, the band's sound has evolved from quick punk riffs to more stripped-down rock music and a developing message of social consciousness. However, the band's influences, which include Rancid, The Replacements, The Clash, Bruce Springsteen, and dozens of other punk and rock n' roll bands, still remains a major element in the band's sound.

This band should not be confused with another punk band by a similar name, Ducky Boys, from Brooklyn, New York, formed in the early 1980s, and featured on the 2006 Staring Down the Barrel compilation, which has over a dozen tracks by very obscure, unknown punk bands from 1979 to 1983.

== History ==
=== Formation and early years ===
The band was formed in 1995 by Mark Lind (age 18), Jason Messina (age 19) and former guitarist Mike Marsden (age 17). The band's first two songs were "White Slum" and "Pride". The band soon recorded their first official release in a 7-inch split with Dropkick Murphys and, within a year, was picked up by GMM Records.

The band's first album, No Gettin' Out, was recorded at Salad Days Studio in Boston and was released in May 1997. With the song "I'll Rise Up", the album has 15 tracks that total a length of almost 39 minutes.

John O'Neill of The Worcester Phoenix called it "an effective, straightforward affair that showed a young band with promise but ultimately suffered from redundant production."

=== Dark Days ===
Soon after the release of No Getting Out, the band, along with guitarist Mike O'Leary, returned to the studio. Recorded between February and March 1998, the album Dark Days helped to define the band and eventually increased their status in the punk rock community. With songs such as "These Are The Days" and "I've Got My Friends", the album was widely praised and deemed a street punk classic.

However, as Lind said in an interview, "we didn't know what we were doing" soon after the release of Dark Days. "We thought bigger than we actually were", he said and, as a result, the band soon experienced turmoil over the future direction and eventually broke up though they would remain on and off until 2002.

=== Three Chords and the Truth ===
After almost five years, which saw several successful side-projects by Lind, Sinners and Saints and Dirty Water, the band permanently re-formed in 2003. Gone were Marsden and O'Leary with the former The Eleventh Hour lead singer Sullivan taking over on lead guitar. The band recorded its third album, Three Chords and the Truth. Produced by Jim Siegel, the album has a clear, big, professional sound found in both the punk shout-outs and melodic rock n' roll type songs.

=== The War Back Home ===
Lind began writing shortly after the release of Three Chords and, within a year, production began on the band's fourth album, The War Back Home. The album was more of a group presentation with several lyrics written by Sullivan and a more complex drum sound. The album has both punk and blues elements with influences from The Clash and Dropkick Murphys clearly heard with the message again evoking social themes of political, social, and economic magnitude. It received relatively positive reviews.

The 12-song album includes "Celebrate", "Bombs Away" and "The Middle Children of History" all of which exhibit the developing style and message of the band, especially focusing on topics such as poverty and the war in Iraq.

=== Chasing the Ghost ===
In 2012, the Ducky Boys released a fifth studio album, Chasing the Ghost. It was recorded at Mad Oak Studios in Allston, Massachusetts. Originally slated to be a 7-inch record or an EP, a break-up brought a surge of songwriting from Lind and the project quickly became a full-length 17-track album. Chasing the Ghost was released in January 2012 on the band's own State Line Records and was followed in May 2012 with the four-song digital EP, Chemicals, with all new songs. None of these were leftovers from the CTG sessions.

=== Dead End Streets ===
The band is currently operating on a "part-time" basis, performing a small number of shows throughout the year, with the line-up of Lind, Messina, Sullivan, and Rich Crimlisk.

Ducky Boys released the album Dead End Streets on State Line Records in June 2013. The band performed an album release show with Swingin Utters and The Welch Boys in June 2013. They regrouped in April 2014 to help organize and perform on a two-night fundraiser for two Boston firemen killed in the line of duty. The benefit shows raised over $52,000 with performances by Street Dogs, Avoid One Thing, Slapshot, Stray Bullets, and The Welch Boys among others.

Ducky Boys have remained relatively silent since 2013 but periodically post updates to their Facebook page. While no upcoming shows have been announced, the band has been clear that it is not over. Rich, Messina, and Lind have been playing in a new band called The Warning Shots.

== Members ==
=== Current members ===
- Mark Lind - bass guitar, vocals (1995-present)
- Jason Messina - drums (1995-present)
- Douglas Sullivan - guitar, vocals (2003-present)
- Rich Crimlisk - guitar, vocals (2003-present)

=== Former members ===
- Mike Marsden - guitar, vocals (1995-2003)
- Mike O'Leary - guitar, vocals (1997-2003)
- James Lynch - guitar, vocals (1998-2000)

== Performances ==
The Ducky Boys have performed with the following bands:

- Rancid
- Dropkick Murphys
- Blood for Blood
- Stiff Little Fingers
- Far From Finished
- Street Dogs
- Swingin Utters
- Flogging Molly
- Hepcat
- The Business
- Roger Miret and the Disasters
- H_{2}O
- Mighty Mighty Bosstones
- Anti-Flag
- Agnostic Front
- Murphy's Law
- Oxymoron
- Pinkerton Thugs
- The Unseen
- Guttermouth
- Voodoo Glow Skulls
- The Ataris
- New York Dolls
- Darkbuster
- The Distillers
- US Bombs
- Catch 22

== Discography ==
=== LPs ===
- No Gettin' Out, 1997
- Dark Days, 1998
- Three Chords and the Truth, 2004
- The War Back Home, 2006
- Chasing the Ghost, 2012
- Dead End Streets, 2013

=== EPs ===
- Ducky Boys/Dropkick Murphys 7-inch
- Ducky Boys/Pinkerton Thugs split 7-inch, 1998
- Ducky Boys/The Shods split 7-inch
- Ducky Boys "Chemicals" EP, 2012 (digital release)
- Ducky Boys/Pinkerton Thugs split 7-inch Vol. 2, 2012
- Chemicals, 2012

=== Compilations ===
- Runt of the Litter Vol. 2 (featuring an early version of Regrets)
- Give 'Em the Boot IV
- Scene Killer Vol 1
- Old Skars and Upstarts 2005
- Oi! Skampilation 3
- Skins & Pins Volume 1
- East Coast of Oi!
- Never Mind the Sex Pistols Here's the Tribute
- I've Got My Friends (Boston/San Francisco split)
