= Signal to Noise (The Rise album) =

Studio album by The Rise
- Released: April 2, 2002
- Recorded: January 2002
- Studio: Non-Linear Studios
- Genre: Post-hardcore; Electronica
- Label: Ferret Records
- Producer: Kevin Ratterman; Mike Blaine

The Rise chronology
Signal to Noise (2002)	Reclamation Process (2005)

Professional ratings
Review scores
Source	Rating
AllMusic	4.5/5 stars
Stylus Magazine	B+

Signal to Noise is the first full-length album by The Rise, released in 2002.

The album combines electronic beats with post-hardcore music, much like Refused did with their 1998 album, the prophetically titled, The Shape of Punk to Come.

It was re-released in 2005 on ReIgnition Recordings.

== Critical reception ==
Stylus Magazine wrote that "it’s extremely refreshing to see a heavy band that actually cares a little bit about their dynamics and sound textures as opposed to just wanting to hit the listener over the head with E chords." The Austin Chronicle called the album "stellar," and likened it to "Atari Teenage Riot with real songs." CMJ New Music Report wrote that "by toying with instrumentation that traditionally doesn't have a home in hardcore, Signal to Noise is as refreshing as it is exciting."

== Track listing ==
1. "The Fallacy of Retrospective Determinism" – 5:23
2. "An Automated Response If You Will" – 2:06
3. "If All You Have is a Hammer Everything Begins to Look Like Nails" – 3:54
4. "Constructive Criticism for a Predetermined Body Type" – 2:42
5. "The Concept of Transience" – 5:04
6. "Station Identification for the Print Less" – 4:08
7. "Sophisticated Approach" – 3:31
8. "51/17" – 3:26
9. "Goals Methodology Assessment" – 6:36
10. "The Machine Question" – 4:14
