= Save It for the Birds =

Studio album by Down to Nothing
- Released: July 29, 2003
- Genre: Hardcore punk
- Length: 33:09
- Label: Thorp Records

Down to Nothing chronology
Save It for the Birds (2003)	Splitting Headache (2005)

Professional ratings
Review scores
Source	Rating
Allmusic	3/5 stars

Save It for the Birds is the first release by straight edge hardcore punk band Down to Nothing.

== Track listing ==
1. Save It for the Birds – 1:09
2. One Eighty – 1:48
3. Normal People – 1:53
4. Outcome – 2:28
5. Choke Louder – 1:09
6. 3 or 4 Years – 0:44
7. Pet Peeve – 0:29
8. Who Are You to Stay – 1:58
9. Honorable Mention Mr. Starky – 2:15
10. What Goes Around Comes Around – 2:53
11. Fire Escape – 16:23

== Personnel ==
- David Wood - vocals
- Daniel Spector - drums
- Scott Eckert - bass
- Alan Long - guitar
- Ryan Groat - guitar

== Production ==
- Recorded and mixed by Andreas Magnusson
- Mastered by Gary Longest
