= Spit My Last Breath =

Studio album by Blood for Blood
- Released: 1997
- Genre: Hardcore punk
- Length: 52:45
- Label: Lost Disciple Records

Blood for Blood chronology
Enemy (1997)	Spit My Last Breath (1997)	Revenge on Society (1998)

Professional ratings
Review scores
Source	Rating
Allmusic	3/5 stars

Spit My Last Breath is the first studio album by American hardcore punk band Blood for Blood. It was released by Lost Disciple Records in 1997. The tracks 10–13 are taken from the five-song Hurt You demo. (The song "You Lose" is missing.) This album was subsequently re-released by Victory Records.

== Track listing ==
1. "Piss All Over Your Hopes and Dreams" – 2:37
2. "Maldito" – 3:47
3. "Can't Heal" – 2:56
4. "Soulless" – 4:54
5. "Fade" – 5:23
6. "Spit My Last Breath" – 4:40
7. "Jaded" – 2:31
8. "Waiting for the Moment" – 4:39
9. "Redemption Denied" – 9:29
10. "Hurt You" – 3:01
11. "Paper Gangster" – 2:18
12. "Chaos" – 3:31
13. "Strain" – 2:59
