= The Rise (band) =

American rock band

- Years active: 2000–2005
- Labels: Ferret, ReIgnition
- Past members: Kemble Walters; Cory Kilduff; Danny Wood; Ben Hicks; Stuart Reilly
- Website: riserock.com

The Rise was a five-piece American band from Austin, Texas. Their sound is a combination of metalcore, hardcore techno, post-hardcore and metal. The band is currently signed to ReIgnition Recordings and their latest album, Reclamation Process, was released on as a free album for subscribers of Law of Inertia, the rock mag product of Cory Killduff. on May 31, 2005. They toured constantly in 2001–2004, and from their inclusion on the Hellfest 2002 compilation DVD.

== Band members ==
=== Last lineup ===
- Kemble Walters – drums (Now plays in Volume. He has also played in the bands Juliette and the Licks and Vise Versa.)
- Cory Kilduff – vocals/electronics
- Danny Wood – bass (Also plays in the bands …And You Will Know Us by the Trail of Dead and The AM Syndicate.)
- Ben Hicks – guitar
- Stuart Reilly – guitar

=== Former members ===
- James Welsh – electronics
- Colin Fee – drummer on Signal to Noise

== Discography ==
=== Albums ===
- 2002: Signal to Noise
- 2004: Reclamation Process

=== DVDs ===
- Hellfest 2002
