= Pinkerton Thugs =

American punk band

The Pinkerton Thugs
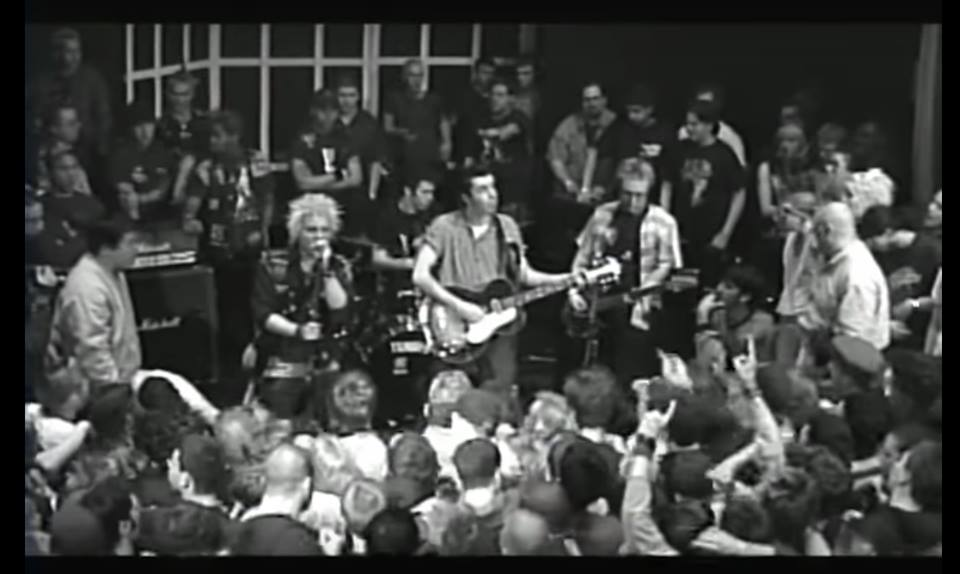
- Pinkerton Thugs performing in 1999

Background information
- Origin: Kennebunk, Maine, U.S.
- Genre: Punk rock
- Years active: 1994–2000, 2008–2012
- Labels: VML, Go-Kart, Jailhouse, State Line
- Past members: James Lynch; Micah Smaldone; James Whitten; Tom Gatton; Mike Kadomiya; Paul Russo

The Pinkerton Thugs were an American punk band from Kennebunk, Maine.

== History ==
The band has been together since July 1994 under a number of different names but officially became the Pinkerton Thugs in March 1996 (taking their name from the infamous Pinkerton National Detective Agency). The band, which initially consisted of drummer/vocalist Paul Russo, guitarist/vocalist Micah Smaldone and bassist James Whitten, drew influence from punk bands such as Sham 69, the Clash, Conflict, and Crass as well as Woody Guthrie's political ballads. They were known for their spirited live performances as well as their radical anarchist political views. Attempting to put their ideas into action, members of the band formed a now-defunct collective called the Anarchist Liberty Union, which set out to distribute anarchist literature for free and establish better communication between activists. During most of the band's existence, Paul Russo was also a member of Boston band The Unseen, whom the Thugs often played shows with.

Their recorded debut was a 7-inch E.P. titled "Life, Liberty, and the Pursuit Of Shit" that was self-released on the band's own Police Records in the U.S. in August 1996 and re-released by Nefer Records in Canada in 1997. In addition to that record, The Pinkerton Thugs released two full albums ("The Pain and The Pinkerton Thugs" on V.M.L. Records in 1997 and "End Of an Era" on Go Kart Records in 2000) a split 7-inch record with the Ducky Boys on Police Records, and a 7-inch on Go Kart Records titled "The Times." The band's later recordings saw Paul Russo playing both drums and additional guitars on the songs he composed and sang, while Tommy "Von" Gatton, who joined the band in 1998, played drums live. Shortly after the recording of "End Of An Era" in early 1999, Smaldone left the band, and Paul Russo became the band's sole lead vocalist. The band played a handful of live gigs with Scott from The Unseen and Bill Brown of Crash and Burn filling in on lead guitar before James Lynch of The Ducky Boys joined as a permanent member. He only played one show with the band before he left to join the Dropkick Murphys.

=== Break-up and subsequent projects ===
Pinkerton Thugs played its last show in February 2000 at the Karma Club in Boston, Massachusetts. End of an Era was released posthumously in June 2000, some 18 months after it was recorded. The band officially disbanded in October of that year, announcing their break-up via their website.

Following the band's demise, Micah Smaldone and Tommy Von formed a hardcore band called Cops and Robbers, which broke up in 2001. Smaldone has subsequently released numerous solo albums under his full name, Micah Blue Smaldone, and played guitar with Out Cold, The Shods, The Racketeers, and Fire on Fire. Tommy Von went on to play in Cut the Shit, The Prowl, and Il Mostro. Paul Russo continued to play with The Unseen before leaving in 2003 and writing and recording his own music under a number of names, including Paul and The Strings, The Strings, and Americana Romantic. He also played guitar with Boston punk band The Vigilantes from mid-2000 until their breakup in early 2002. James Lynch has continued to play with Dropkick Murphys since 2000.

=== Reunion ===
The Pinkerton Thugs officially reunited in 2008 and remained active until 2012. Busy with their other projects, neither Micah Blue Smaldone nor James Lynch were available to participate in the reunion, so Mike "Rufio" Kadomiya joined the band as second guitarist. It was announced in December 2011 that The Pinkerton Thugs had signed with Jailhouse Records and were writing songs for their first, full-length, new material since End Of An Era. James Whitten, Tom Gatton, and Mike Kadomiya all left the band in early 2012. Paul Russo recruited Johnny Noise, Tommy Collins, and Vlad Wormwood as their replacements for a U.S. tour in the summer of 2012. A second split 7-inch with the Ducky Boys, recorded before Gatton and Kadomiya left the band, was released in August 2012. The band has been inactive since.

== Discography ==
=== Studio albums ===
- The Pain and the Pinkerton Thugs CD/LP (1997), VML Records, reissued in 2012 by Jailhouse Records
- End of an Era CD (2000), Go-Kart Records, reissued in 2017 by State Line Records

=== EPs ===
- Life, Liberty, and the Pursuit of Shit 7-inch (1996), Police/Nefer Records
- Another Day, Another Story split 7-inch with the Ducky Boys (1998), Police Records
- The Times 7-inch (1999), A-F/Go-Kart Records
- 45 split 7-inch with the Ducky Boys (2012), Jailhouse Records

== See also ==
- Micah Smaldone
