= The Most (Down to Nothing album) =

Studio album by Down to Nothing
- Released: July 17, 2007
- Genre: Hardcore punk
- Label: Revelation

Down to Nothing chronology
Splitting Headache (2005)	The Most (2007)	Unbreakable (2008)

The Most is the third album released by straight edge hardcore punk band Down to Nothing. It was released on July 17, 2007.

Brian Schultz of Punknews.org rated the album 3.5 out of 5 stars, calling it the band’s "finest effort to date".

== Track listing ==
1. Along for the Ride – 1:06
2. Conquer the World – 2:25
3. My Disguise – 2:44
4. No Faith – 0:35
5. Serve and Neglect – 2:42
6. Down on You – 1:19
7. Well Deserved – 1:56
8. Running Out – 1:43
9. Higher Learning – 2:18
10. Your Loss, Your Regrets – 2:54
11. Up River (Feat. Patrick Flynn of Have Heart) – 1:34
12. Quick to Judge – 1:39

== Personnel ==
Production

- Mastered By – Paul Miner
- Producer – Jim Siegel
