= Planes Mistaken for Stars =

American rock band

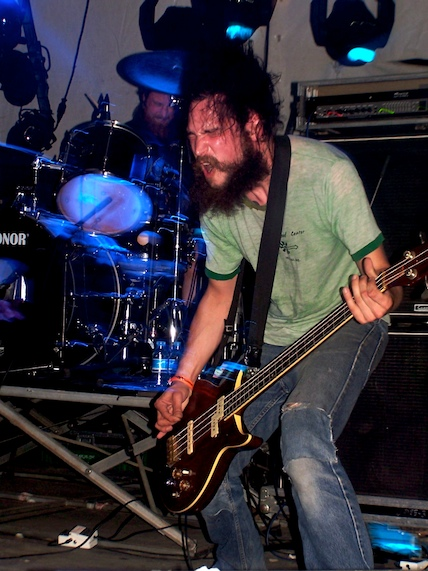
- Planes Mistaken for Stars at Sant Feliu Fest 2006 at Sant Feliu de Guíxols, Spain

Background information
- Origin: Peoria, Illinois, U.S.
- Genres: Rock and roll, heavy metal, punk rock, hardcore punk, post-hardcore (early), emo (early)
- Years active: 1997–2008, 2010–2021
- Labels: Deep Elm, Dim Mak, No Idea, Abacus, Deathwish
- Past members: Chuck French; Neil Keener; Mike Ricketts; Gared O'Donnell; Jamie Drier; Aaron Wise; Matt Bellinger
- Website: planesmistakenforstars.net

Planes Mistaken for Stars was an American rock band. The group was founded in Peoria, Illinois in 1997 and later relocated to Denver, Colorado in 1999. Working with several different labels, they released three studio albums and four EPs before breaking up in 2008. While rooted in the post-hardcore and emo scenes of the turn of the century, Planes Mistaken for Stars developed a distinctive musical style strongly influenced by heavy metal and rock and roll. Reuniting for live performances in 2010, they went on to release their fourth album Prey in 2016.

== History ==
=== Formation (1997–1999) ===
In 1997, lead singer and guitarist Gared O'Donnell started the band with guitarist Matt Bellinger, bassist Aaron Wise and drummer Mike Ricketts. Shortly after the band self-released a self-titled EP in 1998, Wise was replaced by Jamie Drier. Deep Elm later reissued the EP in August 1999. They also released the 7" single Fucking Fight on Steve Aoki's Dim Mak Records later that same year.

=== Intermediate years (1999–2006) ===
In 1999, Planes Mistaken for Stars moved to Denver, Colorado. After the move, the band recorded their second release for Deep Elm, Knife In The Marathon. In 2001, the band signed to Gainesville, Florida's No Idea Records to release Fuck with Fire. The next year they released an EP titled Spearheading the Sin Movement and also made an appearance on Black on Black: A Tribute to Black Flag, a tribute to the hardcore punk band Black Flag.

In 2003, Planes saw its second line up change. Jamie Drier left the band and was replaced by Chuck French, formerly of the band Peralta. Chuck played his first show with Planes on November 2, 2003.

Later that year, Planes recorded Up in Them Guts with A. J. Mogis, whose most notable work is with Saddle Creek artists Bright Eyes and The Faint. Up in Them Guts was released in 2004 on No Idea. To promote the record, the band took on one of the lengthiest tour schedules of their career, covering the United States and Europe with bands such as The Ataris, Cursive, Against Me!, Dillinger Escape Plan, Hot Water Music and High on Fire on six separate tours. They also made festival appearances at Skate and Surf Fest, Strhess Fest, and Hellfest. In 2005, Planes completed three additional headlining tours; one in the United Kingdom, and two in the United States.

In early 2006, Planes' original guitarist Matt Bellinger parted ways with the band to pursue other musical endeavors starting with Ghost Buffalo and Il Cattivo. Despite rumors of the band signing with metal label Relapse Records, they announced a deal with Abacus Recordings in late-2005 and planned to release a new record mid-2006. Originally scheduled for a June 6, 2006 (6/6/6) release, the record had been pushed back in order to accommodate the schedule of the producer they chose to work with, Matt Bayles, who has worked with bands such as Mastodon and Isis. The album Mercy was released on October 3, 2006.

=== Dissolution (2007–2008) ===
A week after the release of Mercy, Abacus Recordings folded. Abacus' parent company Century Media Records offered them a new record deal which, according to O'Donnell, was for "tens of thousands of dollars less" than their previous deal, leaving the band "disheartened." In July 2007, Planes Mistaken for Stars announced that they had broken up, completing their touring schedule with a concert on February 16, 2008, at the Marquis Theater in Denver.

=== Reunion, Prey and O'Donnell's death (2010–2021) ===
Starting in 2010, Planes Mistaken for Stars began to sporadically play shows and go on tour, starting with Fest 9 in Gainesville, Florida. Planes Mistaken for Stars toured the US East Coast in mid-2012, and the US West Coast in mid-2014.

Following a series of cryptic online videos with testimonials from Brann Dailor (Mastodon), Ryan Patterson (Coliseum), Nate Newton (Converge, Old Man Gloom) and Jeremy Bolm (Touché Amoré), the indie label Deathwish Inc. announced it would reissue Planes Mistaken for Stars' 2006 final album Mercy on July 14, 2015, which was followed by a short promotional East Coast US tour. Along with the announcement of the reissue, the band also revealed they had been "quietly and persistently working on new music" for a near-future release also on Deathwish.

A little over a year after initially teasing it, Planes Mistaken for Stars released their fourth full-length album – and first release of new material in 10 years – titled Prey on October 21, 2016, through Deathwish.

On September 19, 2017, an article from Westword by Jason Heller confirmed that guitarist Matt Bellinger had died on September 7. Bellinger had been imprisoned in Douglas County Jail for charges including vehicle trespass, theft, possession of a weapon, and obstructing the police. According to CBS4, the death was ruled as a suicide by hanging, although an investigation was opened to determine the cause of death.

On November 25, 2021, the band confirmed that O'Donnell had died from esophageal cancer. In a statement, they confirmed that the final Planes Mistaken For Stars album had been completed and would be released:

Gared spent the last year of his life doing exactly what he loved, writing and recording music. We are currently working hard to bring these multiple final projects to completion. It is heartbreaking to do this without him, but we know that he would want for us to complete what we had started together. We will do our absolute best to honor his legacy and spread word of the legend that he embodied.

On September 10, 2024 the band announced the album Do You Still Love Me? to be released on November 1, 2024, including material O'Donnell wrote and recorded before his death in 2021.

== Musical style ==
According to The A.V. Club, Planes Mistaken for Stars have "always excelled" in a "space between classic rock, stoner metal, and discordant hardcore". Stereogum called them one of the "heaviest" groups of the "post-hardcore underground of the '00s"; similarly, Metal Hammer called them one of few good bands of the "post-hardcore/emo boom of the early part of the millennium", stating that their "gritty, rough and discordant punk always came laced with melody and imbued with the spirit of classic rock'n'roll". Punknews.org wrote that they are "one of the few [bands] who could mix genres such as metal, hardcore, punk and post-hardcore all together, to such great effect". According to SLUG Magazine, they have existed "on the periphery of emo, punk, hardcore and rock n' roll".

On the subject of Planes Mistaken for Stars' sound, late frontman Gared O'Donnell once stated:

We're just a rock band. (...) I know that if you were to really get down to who we are, I guess you could label us as 'punk rock' but that means so many different things in itself and to so many different people, but I'd say we're all little punk rockers at heart, because that’s what got us into music. (...) I would say we’re heavy. When people ask, 'Well, what do you sound like?' I'm like, I guess we're heavy? I listen to Thin Lizzy as much as I listen to Black Flag as much as I listen to Marvin Gaye. So I'm always just trying to take little pieces of fabric from everything [I] love.

== Band members ==
Final line-up

- Gared O'Donnell – vocals, guitar (1997–2008, 2010–2021; died 2021)
- Mike Ricketts – drums (1997–2008, 2010–2021)
- Chuck French – guitar (2004–2008, 2010–2021), bass (2003–2004)
- Neil Keener – bass (2004–2008, 2010–2021)

Former

- Aaron Wise – bass (1997–1998)
- Jamie Drier – bass (1998–2003)
- Matt Bellinger – guitar, vocals (1997–2006; died 2017)

Timeline

== Discography ==
=== Studio albums ===
- Fuck with Fire (2001, No Idea Records) LP/CD
- Up in Them Guts (2004, No Idea Records) LP/CD
- Mercy (2006, No Idea Records) LP (2006, Abacus Recordings) CD (2015 Remaster, Deathwish Inc.) LP/CD
- Prey (2016, Deathwish Inc.) LP/CD
- Do You Still Love Me? (2024, Deathwish Inc.) LP/CD

=== Compilation albums ===
- We Ride to Fight! (The First Four Years) (2007, No Idea Records) Dble LP/CD

=== Singles, EPs ===
- Planes Mistaken for Stars (1998, Deep Elm Records) 10"/CD
- Planes Mistaken for Stars / Appleseed Cast / Race Car Riot (1999, Deep Elm Records) CD
- Fucking Fight (1999, Dim Mak Records) 7"/CD
- Knife in the Marathon (1999, Dim Mak Records) 12" (2000, Deep Elm Records) CD
- Black On Black: A Tribute To Black Flag Volume Two (2001, Initial Records) 7"
- Spearheading the Sin Movement (2002, No Idea Records) 7"/CD

=== Compilation appearances ===
- Black on Black: A Tribute to Black Flag (2002, Initial)
- If It Plays... (2004, Thinker Thought)
