= Micah Smaldone =

American musician

- Smaldone with The Pinkerton Thugs

Background information
- Also known as: Micah Blue Smaldone
- Born: 1978 (age 46–47)
- Occupation: Musician
- Labels: North East Indie Records; Tequila Sunrise; Young God; Immune Recordings
- Website: www.micahbluesmaldone.net

Micah Smaldone (born 1978) is an American singer, songwriter and guitarist based in Maine. He was a member of several New England area bands, and is best known for the solo music made under his given name, Micah Blue Smaldone.

== Career ==
Growing up in the small town of Kennebunk, Maine, Smaldone developed an interest in punk rock and skateboarding. Smaldone was a founding member of the Pinkerton Thugs, an anarchist street punk band that played an integral part in the mid-1990s Boston punk revival. He played in several other bands of different styles prior to becoming a solo performer around the turn of the century.

Built upon a foundation of fingerstyle Piedmont Blues guitar, Smaldone's solo efforts have expanded over the years into full-band accompaniment, both acoustic and electric, and often vivid, harrowing lyrics.

To date he has released four solo studio albums, and has toured regularly across United States and Europe. Now based in South Portland, Maine, Smaldone has started a new punk project called Wake in Fright. He also builds and sells amplifiers.

== Discography ==
=== Micah Blue Smaldone ===
- Some Sweet Day CD (2004) ( North East Indie Records )
- Hither & Thither CD/LP (2005) ( North East Indie Records /Tequila Sunrise)
- Live In Belgium CD (2007) ( North East Indie Records )
- The Red River CD/LP (2008) (Immune Recordings)
- split release with Big Blood LP (2012) (Immune Recordings)
- Ring of the Rise CD/LP (2013) (Immune Recordings)
- Time/Soft Eyes 7" single (2013) (2000 Records)

=== Collaborations ===
- Death Vessel - Stay Close CD/LP (2005) ( North East Indie Records /Immune Recordings) (guitar, vocals)
- Jack Rose - Dr. Ragtime and His Pals CD/LP (2008) (Beautiful Happiness/Tequila Sunrise) (guitar)
- Fire on Fire - the Orchard (2008) (Young God Records) (upright bass, banjo, vocals)
- Asa Irons - Knife Gift Debt (2013) (Turned Word Records/Laughable Recordings) (upright bass, vocals, production)

=== Compilations ===
- Folk Music for the End of the World CD (2007) (Yer Bird Records)
- Open Strings - Early Virtuoso Recordings From The Middle East, And New Responses CD/LP (2009) (Honest John's Recordings)
- Imaginational Anthem, Vol IV CD/LP (2010) (Tompkins Square)
- La Ballade du beau regard 2x10" (2013) (Okraina Records)
