= No Gettin' Out =

Studio album by The Ducky Boys
- Released: January 1997
- Genre: Punk
- Length: 38:52
- Label: GMM Records
- Producer: Brian McTernam

No Gettin' Out is the first studio album by The Ducky Boys. It was recorded and released in 1997.

John O'Neill of The Worcester Phoenix called it "an effective, straightforward affair that showed a young band with promise but ultimately suffered from redundant production."

== Track listing ==
No.	Title	Writer(s)	Producer(s)	Length
1.	"I’ll Rise Up"	Lind, Jason Messina	Brian McTernam	2:25
2.	"I Don’t Give A Shit"	Lind, Mike Mardsen, Messina	McTernam	2:40
3.	"Pride"	Lind	McTernam	2:33
4.	"The Way It Used To Be"	Lind, Mardsen, Messina	McTernam	2:48
5.	"Cross To Bear (Walk Proud, Stand Tall)"	Lind, Mardsen, Messina	McTernam	2:59
6.	"Get Out Of The Way"	Lind, Mardsen, Messina	McTernam	2:21
7.	"Always Be There"	Lind, Mardsen, Messina	McTernam	3:26
8.	"Nobody's Hero, Nobody's Fool"	Lind, Mardsen, Messina	McTernam	3:02
9.	"I’ll Go Back"	Lind	McTernam	1:52
10.	"Regrets"	Lind	McTernam	2:58
11.	"On My Own"	Lind, Mardsen	McTernam	1:52
12.	"What’s Wrong?"	Lind	McTernam	3:20
13.	"The River"	Lind	McTernam	2:23
14.	"White Slum"	Lind	McTernam	1:49
15.	"Bad Moon Rising"	John Fogerty	McTernam	2:24
Total length:				38:52

== Band members ==
- Mark Lind - bass guitar, vocals
- Mike Marsden - guitar, vocals
- Jason Messina - drums
