= Fuck with Fire =

Album by Planes Mistaken for Stars

Studio album by Planes Mistaken for Stars
- Released: May 1, 2001
- Recorded: 2001
- Genre: Post-hardcore
- Label: No Idea

Planes Mistaken for Stars chronology
Fuck with Fire (2001)	Up in Them Guts (2004)

Professional ratings
Review scores
Source	Rating
Kerrang!	3/5 stars

Fuck with Fire is a studio album by the band Planes Mistaken for Stars, released in 2001.

== Critical reception ==
The Chicago Reader wrote: "Sinister, gravelly, and coated in sheets of sonic raunch, Fuck With Fire is planted firmly in the burgeoning early-aughts posthardcore scene, with one foot in the anthemic beard-rock of Hot Water Music, Small Brown Bike, and Against Me! and the other in the blistering metalcore of Converge and Botch." Decibel called the album an "un-fuckwithable masterstroke." Jason Heller, in The A.V. Club, wrote that it "still holds up as one of the most excruciatingly honest, sickeningly sludgy expressions of post-hardcore circa the early 21st century."

== Track listing ==
No.	Title	Length
1.	"Leveless"	2:18
2.	"End Me in Richmond"	2:45
3.	"Funeral for a Friend"	2:04
4.	"Hollowpoint and Whiskey"	2:57
5.	"Bloody But Unbowed"	2:41
6.	"Fuck with Fire"	1:35
7.	"Rhythm Dies"	4:49
8.	"Sicilian Smile"	2:56
9.	"I'll See You in Hell"	3:48
10.	"Get Burned"	3:00
Total length:		28:58

== Personnel ==
=== Band ===
- Gared O'Donnell - vocals, guitar
- Matt Bellinger - guitar, vocals
- Jamie Drier - bass
- Mike Ricketts - drums

=== Production ===
- Brendan Gamble
