= Masters of Horror (soundtrack) =

2005 compilation soundtrack album; various artists

Masters of Horror is the soundtrack accompanying the television series Masters of Horror. Volume 1 sold over 50,000 copies.

== Volume 1 Track listing ==
Masters of Horror

Soundtrack album by Various Artists
- Released: October 18, 2005
- Genre: Heavy metal; hard rock
- Length: 1:54:43
- Label: Immortal
- Producer: Happy Walters; Jason Markey; Jennifer Ross

Professional ratings
Review scores
Source	Rating
Allmusic	3.5/5 stars

Disc One
No.	Title	Artist	Length
1.	"Small Silhouette"	Mudvayne	3:02
2.	"ShaunLuu"	Norma Jean	3:43
3.	"Enjoy the Silence" (Depeche Mode cover)	It Dies Today	4:00
4.	"Lazarus (In the Wilderness)"	Funeral for a Friend	2:47
5.	"You Will Remember Tonight"	Andrew W.K.	3:24
6.	"Very Invisible"	Armor for Sleep	4:22
7.	"What's Up Now"	Scary Kids Scaring Kids	4:23
8.	"This Is My Own"	Shadows Fall	4:46
9.	"Nervous Breakdown" (Black Flag cover)	The Bled	2:07
10.	"The Big Sleep"	Murder by Death	4:00
11.	"Division St." (acoustic)	Thursday	4:34
12.	"Overload"	Bloodsimple	3:23
13.	"Megalodon" (live)	Mastodon	4:38
14.	"Bottled Up"	Death by Stereo	3:07
15.	"At Least You Bought Her Flowers"	Fall River	4:51

Disc Two
No.	Title	Artist	Length
1.	"We Are One" (feat. Serj Tankian)	Buckethead	4:01
2.	"Obstructed View"	Rise Against	2:02
3.	"Bats!"	The Bronx	2:24
4.	"Betwixt Her Getaway Sticks"	From Autumn to Ashes	3:10
5.	"Keith the Music"	Every Time I Die	3:14
6.	"In Transit (For You)"	Matchbook Romance	5:20
7.	"Hindsight"	BEDlight for BlueEYES	4:03
8.	"We Can Never Break Up"	Alkaline Trio	3:08
9.	"Beast and the Harlot" (live)	Avenged Sevenfold	6:04
10.	"Discover Me Like Emptiness"	In Flames	4:11
11.	"The Thin Red Line"	A Change of Pace	2:51
12.	"Victoria Iceberg"	Bear vs. Shark	3:56
13.	"If Ever" (Acoustic)	Gratitude	3:52
14.	"237"	Fear Before the March of Flames	3:16
15.	"Contrast of Light and Dark"	Yesterdays Rising	6:04

== Volume 2 Track listing ==
Masters of Horror, Vol. 2

Soundtrack album by Various Artists
- Released: October 24, 2006
- Genre: Heavy metal, hard rock
- Length: 59:07
- Label: Immortal

No.	Title	Artist	Length
1.	"New Hate Rising"	Hatebreed	2:36
2.	"Foetus of a New Day Kicking"	Cradle of Filth	3:44
3.	"Virtual Environment"	Lacuna Coil	5:23
4.	"Needles" (Live Acoustic)	Seether	4:53
5.	"I Like to Move in the Night"	Eagles of Death Metal	4:00
6.	"Dirthouse" (Live Acoustic)	Shinedown	4:50
7.	"Threnody"	Chimaira	4:04
8.	"The Devil"	Wax on Radio	7:06
9.	"Black Refuge"	Junip	3:27
10.	"Drop Your Panties"	Wounded Cougar	2:40
11.	"This Calling"	All That Remains	3:39
12.	"Effigy"	The Smashup	4:37
13.	"The Machine"	Asunder	4:35
14.	"The Afterlife"	2Cents	3:33
