= Shadows of Vanity =

Studio album by Hell Within
- Released: May 15, 2007
- Recorded: November 2006
- Genre: Metalcore
- Length: 33:51
- Label: Lifeforce
- Producer: Hell Within and John Ellis

Hell Within chronology
Asylum of the Human Predator (2005)	Shadows of Vanity (2007)	God Grant Me Vengeance (2010)

Professional ratings
Review scores
Source	Rating
Allmusic	3.5/5 stars
Asice	3.5/5 snowflakes
Away Team	9/10
Gauntlet	2/5
Lords of Metal	83/100
Tartarean Desire	10/10
Unbound Zine	4/4 skulls

Shadows of Vanity is Hell Within's second studio album.

== Track listing ==
1. "Shadows of Vanity" – 4:07
2. "My Exit in Red" – 3:27
3. "Lay Down Your Arms" – 3:51
4. "The Spiral" – 3:39
5. "In the Absence of Fire" – 3:44
6. "Between the Dead and the Deceived" – 2:04
7. "For the Taking" – 4:00
8. "Merciless" – 3:34
9. "A Silent Prayer for the Haunted" – 5:21

== Personnel ==
- Matthew McChesney – vocals
- Isaias "Zay" Martinez – guitar
- Tony Zimmerman – guitar
- Joe Martinez – bass
- Derek Jay – drums
