= Mercy (Planes Mistaken for Stars album) =

Studio album by Planes Mistaken for Stars
- Released: October 3, 2006
- Genres: Post-hardcore, heavy metal, emo
- Length: 38:04
- Label: Abacus
- Producer: Matt Bayles

Planes Mistaken for Stars chronology
Up in Them Guts (2004)	Mercy (2006)	We Ride to Fight! (2007)

Mercy is the third studio album by American rock band Planes Mistaken for Stars released in 2006, and was the final album of new material before the band's 2008 disbandment. After several releases on No Idea Records, the band signed to Abacus Recordings — a short-lived heavy metal imprint of Century Media Records that also featured Ion Dissonance and Sick of It All. Guitarist Gared O’Donnell commented on the transition between labels, stating: "Right after Up in Them Guts [2004] came out, other labels expressed interest. We made the decision to do something different, and No Idea backed us up. They said, 'Listen, you've hit the ceiling with what we can do for you. If you want to go to another label for the next record, you have our blessing.'" Mercy was produced by the Seattle-based producer Matt Bayles (Botch, Isis, Mastodon) and was officially released through Abacus on October 3, 2006.

In 2015, Converge vocalist Jacob Bannon's hardcore label Deathwish Inc. reissued Mercy. This version was remastered by Brad Boatwright (Bane, Old Man Gloom, Code Orange) with the original 1/2-inch tapes and features revamped artwork and packaging.

== Critical reception ==
Upon release in 2006, the album was met with generally favorable reviews. Sam Sutherland of Canada's Exclaim! magazine said the album is, "Gritty, unrefined post-punk that trashes around all over the lines that separate punk, hardcore, and good old rock'n'roll, Mercy is awash in spastic drumming, off-kilter riffs, and some of the finest throaty bellowing this side of Gainesville." Ned Raggett of AllMusic said, "[...] the compelling impact of this album is not merely what it synthesizes but how it delivers the results — whatever their emo roots were, lumping these guys in with Panic! At the Disco would be pretty ridiculous." Among other tracks, both Sutherland and Raggett praised Mercy's opening and closing tracks, "One Fucked Pony" and "Penitence" respectively. Sutherland noted "One Fucked Pony"'s stylistic change from the band's usual screamo sound on past records to stoner rock similar to Kyuss or Fu Manchu set a tone for the record, while observing that "Penitence" was "one of the most interesting sonic departures" on the album. Raggett described Gared O'Donnell's vocals on "One Fucked Pony" as "barking in a tortured but defiant rasp while the band finds a good intersection between sprawling boogie and tense, trebly riffs, not to mention just slowing down to a total crawl at the drop of a hat," and that the acoustic closer "Penitence" helped Mercy to "seem like a massive epic."

== Track listing ==
1. "One Fucked Pony" – 4:09
2. "Crooked Mile" – 3:01
3. "Widow: A Love Song" – 2:04
4. "Keep Your Teeth" – 4:45
5. "To Spit a Sparrow" – 2:48
6. "Never Felt Prettier" – 2:44
7. "Killed by Killers Who Kill Each Other" – 3:24
8. "Little Death" – 3:20
9. "Church Date" – 3:42
10. "Mercy" – 4:32
11. "Penitence" – 3:35
