= Bombs Away: The Story of a Bomber Team =

Non-fiction book by John Steinbeck

Bombs Away
- Cover of Bombs Away
- Author: John Steinbeck
- Language: English
- Publisher: Viking Press
- Publication date: 1942
- Publication place: United States
- Media type: Print (Hardback and Paperback)

Bombs Away: The Story of a Bomber Team is a non-fiction book by the American author John Steinbeck. It was written in 1942 and published by Viking Press. The book is an account of Steinbeck's experiences with several bomber crews of the US Army Air Forces during the Second World War.

On accepting the brief for Bombs Away from Henry H. Arnold, Steinbeck wrote to his wife "It's a tremendous job I've taken on and I have to do it well." He was commissioned to write it as part of an effort to increase Air Force recruitment and morale.

Steinbeck traveled more than 20,000 miles in 30 days with photographer John Swope to various Air Force bases in the United States with the assignment of documenting the various jobs needed to form a bombing team. In particular, he relates the stories of six men and describes their respective duties. They are the pilot, navigator, bombardier, crew chief, gunner, and radio man.
