= The War Back Home =

Studio album by The Ducky Boys
- Released: May 2, 2006
- Genre: Punk
- Length: 32:34
- Label: Sailor's Grave Records

The Ducky Boys chronology
Three Chords and the Truth	The War Back Home

Professional ratings
Review scores
Source	Rating
About.com	link
PunkNews.org	link

The War Back Home is the fourth studio album of The Ducky Boys. It was recorded and released in 2006. The album was a total band collaboration with lyrics written by both bassist Mark Lind and guitarist Douglas Sullivan. This is the Ducky Boy's first album on the label of Sailor's Grave Records..

== Track listing ==
1. "Celebrate" – 2:45
2. "The Middle Children of History" – 2:18
3. "Tortured Soul" - 2:35
4. "Isolation" – 2:39
5. "Kids" – 2:29
6. "Two Thieves and a Savior" – 2:24
7. "City Girl" – 2:30
8. "Bombs Away" – 3:13
9. "Corporate America" – 2:54
10. "Outlaw" - 3:40
11. "This Time Last Year" – 2:53
12. "Contrived and Treacherous" – 2:00

== Band members ==
- Mark Lind - vocals, bass
- Douglas Sullivan - guitar, vocals
- Jason Messina - drums
