= Dark Days (The Ducky Boys album) =

Studio album by The Ducky Boys
- Released: March 1998
- Genre: Punk
- Length: 43:09
- Label: GMM Records
- Producer: Jim Siegel, The Ducky Boys

Dark Days is the second studio album of The Ducky Boys. It was recorded between February and March 1998 at The Outpost in Stoughton, Massachusetts. This is the band's second of two albums with GMM Records and the last album before the band broke up for five years before re-forming in 2003. (NOTE: GMM also released "Live from the Banks of the River Charles" after "Dark Days", but "Live..." is not a full-length album.)

== Track listing ==
1. "These Are The Days" – 3:09
2. "Out Of The Rut" – 2:39
3. "Me Against The World" – 3:48
4. "Do You Wrong" – 3:40
5. "We'll Find A Way" – 3:09
6. "All For One & One For All" – 2:51
7. "I've Got My Friends" – 2:15
8. "Fourteen" – 3:39
9. "I'll Rise Up" – 2:19
10. "Another Day" – 3:38
11. "A Better Life" – 3:31
12. "Misfit" – 3:31
13. "No Tales To Tell" – 2:43
14. "The Ballad Of The Forgotten" – 2:17

== Personnel ==
- Mark Lind – bass, vocals
- Mike Marsden – guitar, vocals
- Mike O'Leary – guitars, vocals
- Jason Messina – drums, background vocals

== Trivia ==
- In 2006, Dropkick Murphys covered the song "I've Got My Friends" during several live performances.
- This is the last Ducky Boys record to feature original guitarist Mike Marsden, as well as the only to feature second guitarist Mike O'Leary.
- O'Leary was still in high school and unable to tour in support of the album. This led to James Lynch filling in on the road. Lynch eventually joined Dropkick Murphys as their guitarist.
