= James Lynch (musician) =

American guitarist (born 1979)

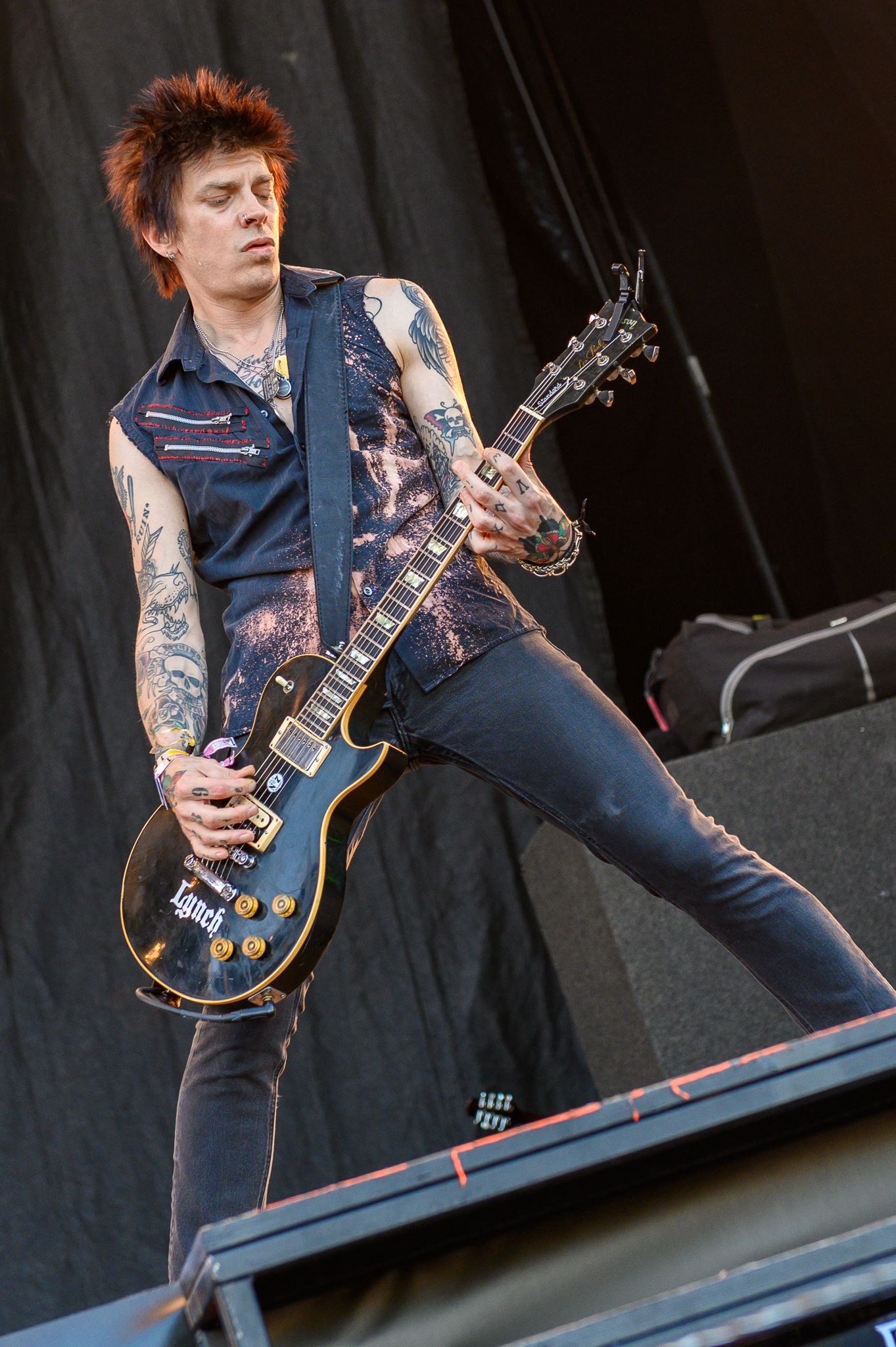
- Lynch in 2019

Background information
- Born: James Patrick Lynch; July 29, 1979 (age 46); Sturbridge, Massachusetts, U.S.
- Genres: Celtic punk; folk punk
- Occupation: Guitarist
- Years active: 2000–present
- Member of: Dropkick Murphys
- Formerly of: The Ducky Boys; Pinkerton Thugs

James Patrick Lynch (born July 29, 1979) is an American musician who is a guitarist and backing vocalist of the Boston Celtic punk group Dropkick Murphys.

== Career ==
Lynch joined Dropkick Murphys in 2000 to record the album Sing Loud, Sing Proud. He had previously been a member of the Boston-based bands The Ducky Boys and Pinkerton Thugs. When Marc Orrell left the band in 2008, Lynch was asked to move up to lead guitar, but declined because he enjoyed his position in the band where he only played one instrument. Instead Tim Brennan was moved up to lead guitar and Jeff DaRosa was brought on to play banjo and mandolin. Lynch also played in the band Gimmie Danger along with Marc Orrell, Tim Brennan, and Ben Karnavas.

== Gear ==
Lynch plays a black early 80s Gibson Les Paul Standard and a black 1981 Les Paul Custom as both his primary and backup guitars for live performances and studio recordings. He also uses a white 1986 or 87 Gibson ES-175 for, as his tech puts it, "slower, ballad-ey type songs" like "Broken Hymns" and "Cruel", both off of Going Out in Style. Lynch runs his guitars through two Orange Rocker 30 (not to be confused with Orange's better known Rockerverb amps) thirty watt amp heads connected to 4x12 Marshall cabinets. While the Rocker 30s are Lynch's preferred amps, he has also been known to use Marshall JCM800, Marshall Slash signature and Silverface Fender Bandmaster amps onstage and in the studio as well.
