= Blood for Blood =

American hardcore punk band

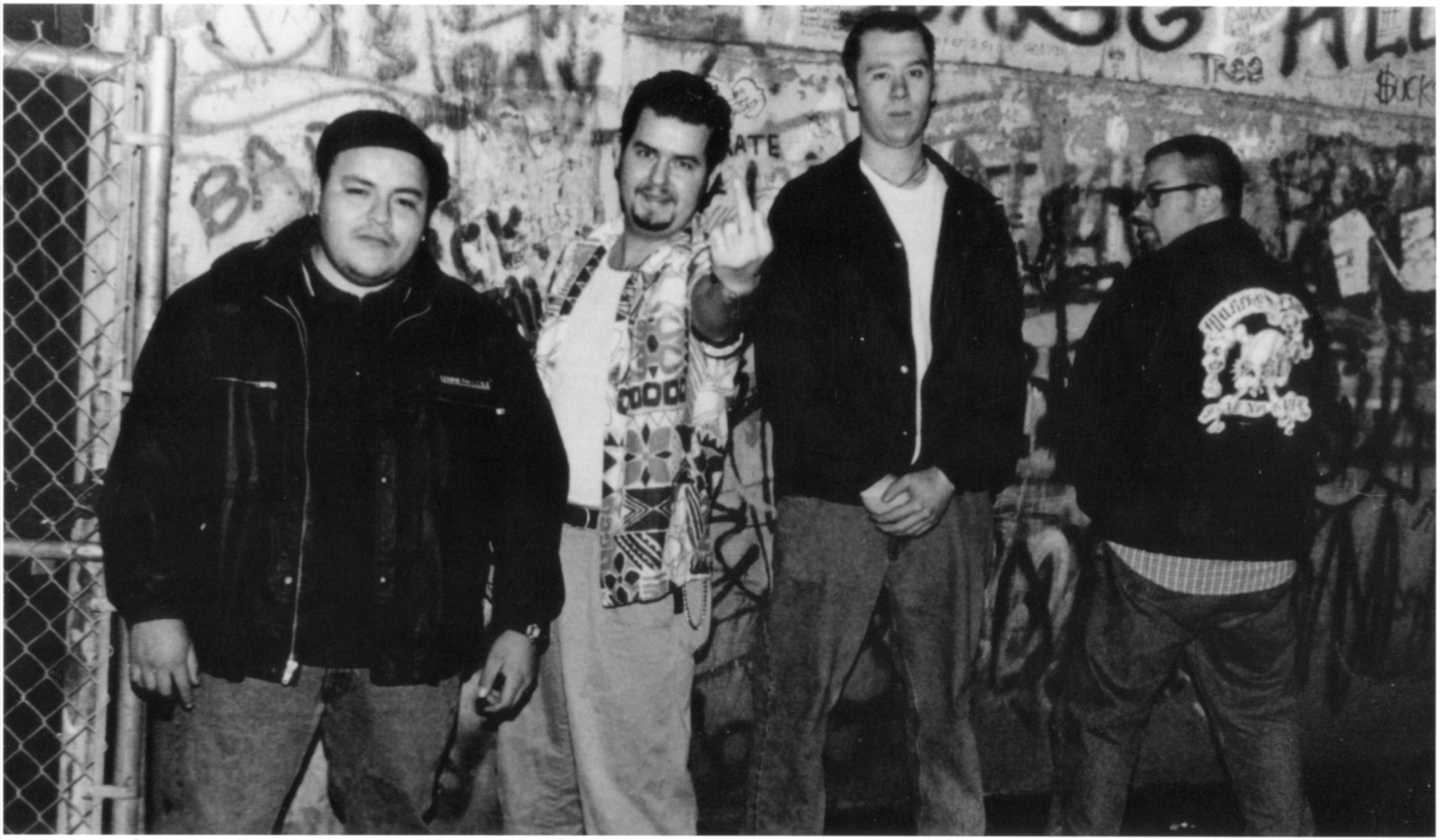
- Erick "Buddha" Medina, "White Trash" Rob Lind, Ian McFarland, and former drummer Mike "Cap'n" Mahoney

Background information
- Origin: Boston, Massachusetts, U.S.
- Genre: Hardcore punk
- Years active: 1994–2004; 2010–2012; 2025–present
- Labels: Roadrunner; Victory; Thorp; I Scream
- Members: Ian McFarland "White Trash" Rob Lind; Peter Morcey; Justin Legere; Jamie Muckinhaupt
- Past members: Billy Graziadei; Erick "Buddha" Medina; Mike "Cap'n" Mahoney; Gina Benevides; Greg Dellaria; Jeremy Wooden; Craig Silverman; Dustin Hengst; Neal Dike; Robert Falzano

Blood for Blood is an American hardcore punk band from Boston, Massachusetts. It was formed in 1994 by Erick "Buddha" Medina and "White Trash" Rob Lind, drawing inspiration from the hardcore scene in Boston and New York. In 1997, they were signed to Victory Records. The band describes its sound as influenced by Sheer Terror, Breakdown, Carnivore and Killing Time.

After their 2004 album was released, the band went on hiatus until 2010, and went on a second hiatus in 2012 following the dismissal of their singer Erick Medina.

In December 2025, band announced their official signing to Roadrunner Records, and their first single in 21 years, "You’re Gonna Have to Kill Me".

== History ==
=== Formation and early years (1994-2002) ===
Blood for Blood was formed in 1994 by vocalist Erick "Buddha" Medina and guitarist "White Trash" Rob Lind, drawing inspiration from the hardcore scene in Boston and New York. To round out the band they recruited drummer Mike Mahoney, and bassist Jeremy Wooden. In the mid 1990s the group self released multiple demos and Eps including Hurt You Demo (1995) and Soulless (1996). The bands original bass player Wooden left in 1995, and was replaced by Greg Dellaria who was also only in the band for one year before being replaced by Gina Benavides. Benavides who joined the band in 1996, he was replaced by Ian McFarland in 1997 who remained a permanent fixture in the lineup. That year a second Ep titled Enemy was released.

Throughout the first three years of the bands tenure Blood for Blood played a majority of their live shows in their home state of Massachusetts.

On June 22, 1997, they released their debut album Spit My Last Breath via Lost Disciple Records the album was later re released on Victory Records after the band signed with the label later that same year. On April 7, 1998 their second album Revenge on Society was released via Victory Records. In support of the album Blood for Blood embarked on their first European tour alongside The Bruisers. On June 29, 1999, Blood for Blood released their third studio album Livin' in Exile. In the Fall of that year Blood for Blood toured the U.S. alongside Dropkick Murphys, Anti-Flag and Beerzone. Sometime in 1999 drummer Mike "Cap'n" Mahoney left the band and was replaced by Dustin Hengst.

On April 24, 2001 Blood For Blood released a compilation titled Wasted Youth Crew, which featured some of the bands hard-to-find tracks, and multiple live songs. They then returned to the studio to record their third studio album Outlaw Anthems which was released on January 15, 2002. Following the album’s release went on a mini US tour with Death Threat in June, and also embarked on a U.S. tour with Most Precious Blood and Sick Of It All in September of that year.

=== First hiatus and reunion (2004-2024) ===
In January 2004, it was announced the band was wrapping up work on their fifth studio album and had signed with Thorp Records. Serenity was then released on June 22, of that year, being the only album to feature drummer Neal Dike. Blood for Blood then embarked on their final set of tour dates with their last show in six years at Hellfest on July 24. The band then went on hiatus until 2010. A major factor into why Blood for Blood went on hiatus was due to guitarist and songwriter Rob Lind decided touring with the band would be detrimental to his newfound sobriety, having been a heroin addict and alcoholic for many years, and feared a relapse.

In an interview with Ox-Fanzine vocalist Erick Medina further touched upon the bands hiatus stating:

We never broke up with the band, we just didn't play any shows anymore. There were very different, personal reasons for this. I became a father and Ian had a lot on his job. But then somehow more and more people came up to us and wanted us to play concerts again. We tried to get Rob back into the band, but that turned out to be very difficult. But somehow we found each other, so that we will even release a new album at the end of 2011.

The band officially returned in the December of 2010 taking part in that year’s Persistence tour alongside Sick Of It All, and Sepultura. The lineup consisted of Medina as vocalist, McFarland on bass, Neal Dike on drums and as a tour replacement, the band called upon Billy Graziadei from Biohazard to fill in on guitar duties in Lind's absence. Blood for Blood also added additional guitarist Craig Silverman of Only Living Witness and Slapshot to the lineup. In the Summer of 2011 Blood for Blood went on a European tour and also announced they were working on a new album with guitarist Rob Lind. In July 2012, vocalist Erick "Buddha" Medina was kicked out of the band after accusations of pinning a 13 year old girl against a wall, and kissing her as she struggled, as well as rape. The group then postponed all up coming shows.

A Blood for Blood tribute band played at Rockfest 2016 and in 2017 Blood for Blood reunited for a one off show.

=== Second reunion (2025-present) ===
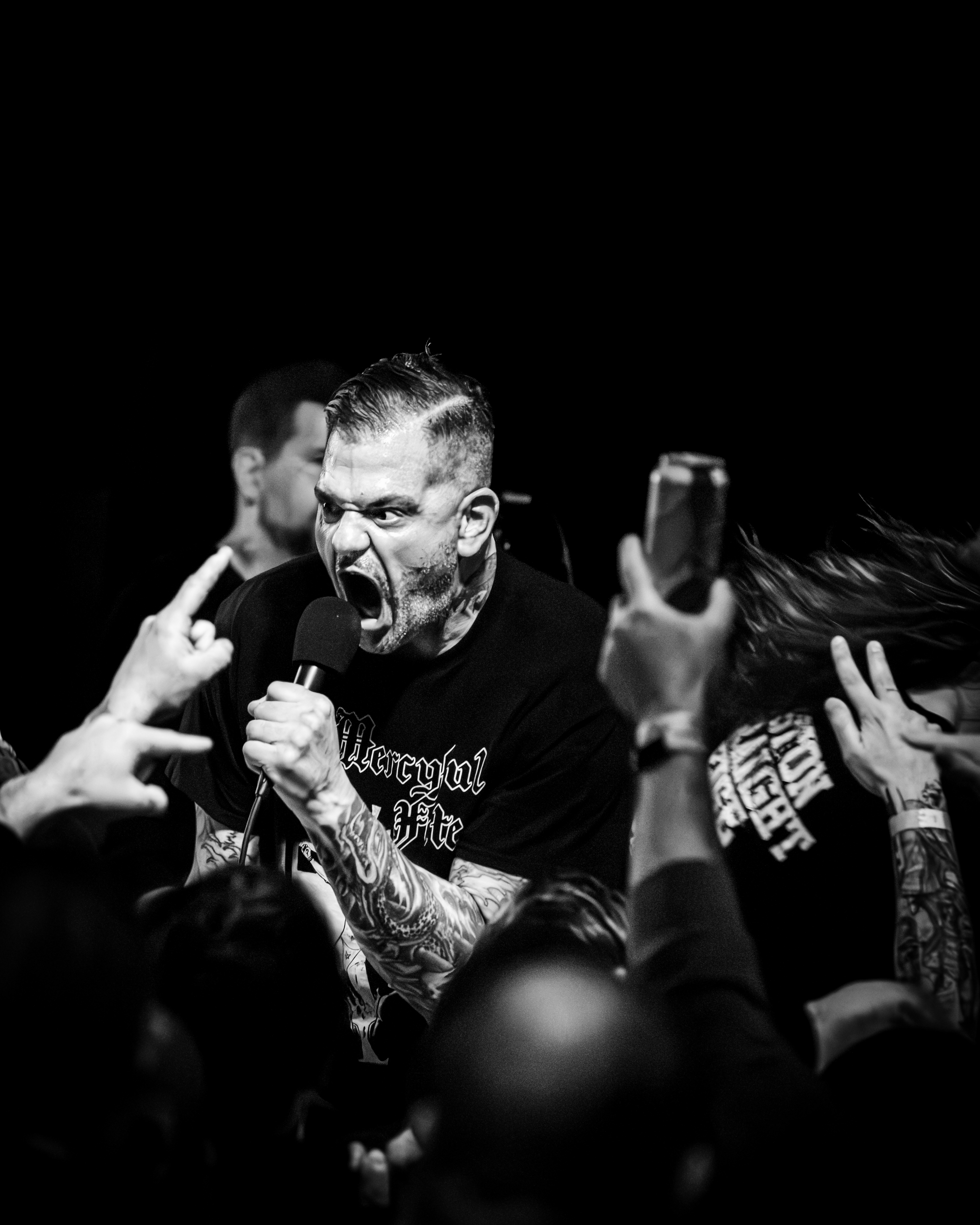
Peter Morcey of Blood for Blood performing at Brooklyn Monarch on April 10th 2026

In December 2025, while announcing their official reunion at For The Children in Boston, the band announced their official signing to Roadrunner Records, and their first single in 21 years, "You’re Gonna Have to Kill Me". The new lineup consists of Rob Lind and bassist Ian McFarland along with Pete Morcey (100 Demons, Forced Reality) on vocals, Jamie Muckinhaupt (Death Threat) on drums, and Justin Legere (Laid 2 Rest, Living Weapon) on guitar. The band embarked on a US tour alongside Skinhead in the Spring of 2026, and will also play at Louder Than Life in September and Revolution Calling in November. Blood for Blood will tour the US throughout the late 2026, with bands such as Ingrown, Dropdead, Death Before Dishonor, Bloodshed, and Yellow Stitches serving as support.

== Musical style ==
Blood for Blood is a hardcore band with AllMusic stating that they also combine elements of metal and punk. Blabbermouth.net wrote on the bands style stating "Blood for Blood has quietly achieved its rightful place in the hardcore pantheon, thanks to an all-out punk and hardcore assault delivered with metallic precision, laced with venomous swagger and spiked with a sarcastic sense of humor." The group has claimed that their songs and lyrics are for "rejects, outcast and people who don’t know where to turn in life."

Some of the bands influences include Sick of It All, Terror, Agnostic Front, Breakdown, Carnivore, Killing Time, Misfits, Dead Kennedys, Biohazard and Sheer Terror. However the bands guitarist and songwriter Rob Lind stated that he doesn’t have any personal influences and the bands music followed the progression of their lyrics.

== Live performances ==
During the band’s early years Blood for Blood became notorious for their live performances being violent due to the audience getting into large brawls and riots. This resulted in the band having a large police presence at their shows. In a 2011 interview guitarist Rob Lind revealed that their reputation resulted in the band getting banned from playing in multiple cites and states in the US including their home state of Massachusetts. The Worcester Telegram wrote "they are kind of band that makes you a little nervous when they take the stage, and then fear for your life when they hit the first note."

== Band members ==
=== Current ===
- "White Trash" Rob Lind – guitar, vocals (1994–2012, 2025–present)
- Peter Morcey - vocals (2025–present)
- Ian McFarland – bass (1997–2012, 2025–present)
- Justin Legere – guitar (2025–present)
- Jamie Muckinhaupt – drums (2025–present)

=== Past ===
- Erick "Buddha" Medina – vocals (1994–2012)
- Robert Falzano – drums (2012)
- Mike "Cap'n" Mahoney – drums (1994–1999)
- Gina Benavides – bass (1996–1997)
- Greg Dellaria – bass (1995)
- Jeremy Wooden – bass (1994–1995)
- Dustin Hengst – drums (Outlaw Anthems)
- Neal Dike – drums (2004–2012)
- Craig Silverman – guitar (live) (2010–2012)
- Billy Graziadei – guitar (live) (2010)
- Shane Williams - vocals

== Discography ==
=== Studio albums ===
Title	Release date	Label
Spit My Last Breath	June 22, 1997	Victory Records
Revenge on Society	April 17, 1998	Victory Records
Livin' in Exile	July 13, 1999	Victory Records
Outlaw Anthems	January 15, 2002	Victory Records
Serenity	June 22, 2004	Thorp Records

=== Other ===
Title	Release date	Label
1st Demo (cassette)	1994	(Unreleased)
Hurt You Demo (cassette)	1995	Self-released
Soulless (EP)	1996	Devour Records
Enemy	1997	Lost Disciple Records/Open Handed Records (vinyl)
Wasted Youth Brew	April 24, 2001	Victory Records
