= Splitting Headache =

Studio album by Down to Nothing
- Released: July 12, 2005
- Genre: Hardcore punk
- Length: 20:40
- Label: Thorp Records

Down to Nothing chronology
Save It for the Birds (2003)	Splitting Headache (2005)	The Most (2007)

Professional ratings
Review scores
Source	Rating
AllMusic	4/5 stars

Splitting Headache is the second album by American hardcore punk band Down to Nothing.

== Track listing ==
1. Go Ahead wit Yo' Fake Ass – 0:52
2. Us v. Each Other – 1:49
3. I Can't Believe My Eyes – 2:29
4. Smash It – 0:54
5. Burn III – 1:55
6. Unbreakable – 2:22
7. Home Sweet Home – 1:39
8. We're on the Run – 1:54
9. Risk It – 0:56
10. Skate & Annoy, Vol. 2.0 (Skate or Die) – 0:11
11. I'm So Lucky – 1:48

== Personnel ==
Production

- Gary Llama – recording (tracks 8–11)
