= Down to Nothing =

American hardcore punk band

- Also known as: DTN
- Origin: Richmond, Virginia, U.S.
- Genre: Hardcore punk
- Years active: 2000–2019
- Labels: Revelation, Thorp, Reaper, Dead Souls
- Members: David Wood; Daniel Spector; Jared Carman; Alan Long; Matthew Carr
- Past members: Ryan Groat; Ryan Wall; Scott Eckert; Hunter Jennings; Adam Barker

Down to Nothing (or DTN) was a straight edge hardcore punk band from Richmond, Virginia. Since their inception in 2000, the band has toured all over the world. Their most recent studio recording is the 2013 LP Life on the James on Revelation Records, preceded by CD/vinyl EP titled All My Sons released in 2010 on Reaper Records (US) and Dead Souls Records (AUS). Down to Nothing's first two albums, Save It for the Birds and Splitting Headache, are currently out of print but were re-released in February 2008 on one CD/LP titled Unbreakable. In 2009 singer David Wood joined Terror as bassist and backing vocals, this tenure would last until 2017. Since their appearance in 2019 at the Have Heart reunion shows at the Worcester Palladium, the band has been inactive.

Members of Down to Nothing have also played in Terror and Trapped Under Ice.

== Members ==
=== Final Lineup ===
- David Wood – Vocals
- Daniel Spector – Drums
- Jared Carman – Bass
- Alan Long – Guitar
- Matt Carr – Guitar

=== Past ===
- Michael Ireland — singer
- Scott Eckert — bass
- Adam Barker — bass
- Ryan Groat — guitar
- Ryan Wall — Ryan Wall
- Hunter Jennings — guitar

== Discography ==
=== Studio albums ===
- Save It for the Birds (Thorp Records, 2003)
- Splitting Headache (Thorp Records, 2005)
- The Most (Revelation Records, 2007)
- Life on the James (Revelation Records, 2013)

=== Split releases ===
- Split 7"/CD with Kids Like Us (Knife or Death Records, 2005)
- Split 7" with On Thin Ice (2005)
- Split with 50 Lions (6131 Records, 2008)

=== EPs and other releases ===
- Down to Nothing Demo (Dead By 23, 2002)
- Higher Learning (Revelation Revords, 2006)
- Unbreakable (Revelation Records, 2008)
- All My Sons (Reaper Records, Dead Souls Records, 2010)
- Live! On the James (Revelation Records, 2017)
