= ReIgnition Recordings =

Historical Society Of Karimjo Kingdom

- Founded: 1999
- Founder: Ross Siegel
- Distributor(s): Suburban Home Records, Revelation Records, IODA Alliance
- Genre: Metalcore, post-hardcore, punk
- Country of origin: U.S.
- Official website: www.reignitionrecordings.com (Archive index at the Wayback Machine; live 2005MAR12–2010APR28, redirects to re-ignition.com 2010JUN28), www.reignition.com (Archive index at the Wayback Machine; unrelated content –2004DEC13, live 2005FEB06–2010JAN07, redirects to re-ignition.com 2012MAY15–2014APR10, dead 2014NOV07–), re-ignition.com (Ross Siegel's blog; Archive index at the Wayback Machine; dead –2005JUL25, live 2009OCT23–2010JUN08, dead 2010JUN16–)

ReIgnition Recordings was an independent record label releasing largely, but not solely, punk and post-hardcore albums. It was founded in Ithaca, NY in 1999, and operated under the name Law of Inertia Records after the magazine founded by Ross Siegel. It was renamed in December 2004 to maintain the journalistic integrity of the magazine.

== Artists ==
- Alli with an I
- Angels in the Architecture
- Billy Music
- Dead Girls Ruin Everything
- Death by Stereo
- Drowningman
- Edaline
- Ettison Clio
- Grey AM
- Marathon
- Reel Big Fish
- The '65 Film Show
- The A.K.A.s
- The Beautiful Mistake
- The Reunion Show
- The Rise
- The Scaries
- The Static Age
- This Year's Model
- Ultimate Fakebook
- Zolof The Rock & Roll Destroyer

== Distributed artists ==
- Fire When Ready
- Nakatomi Plaza
- Scream! Hello
- Trophy Scars
- Your Black Star

== See also ==
- List of record labels
