= Ian McFarland (musician) =

Bassist and director

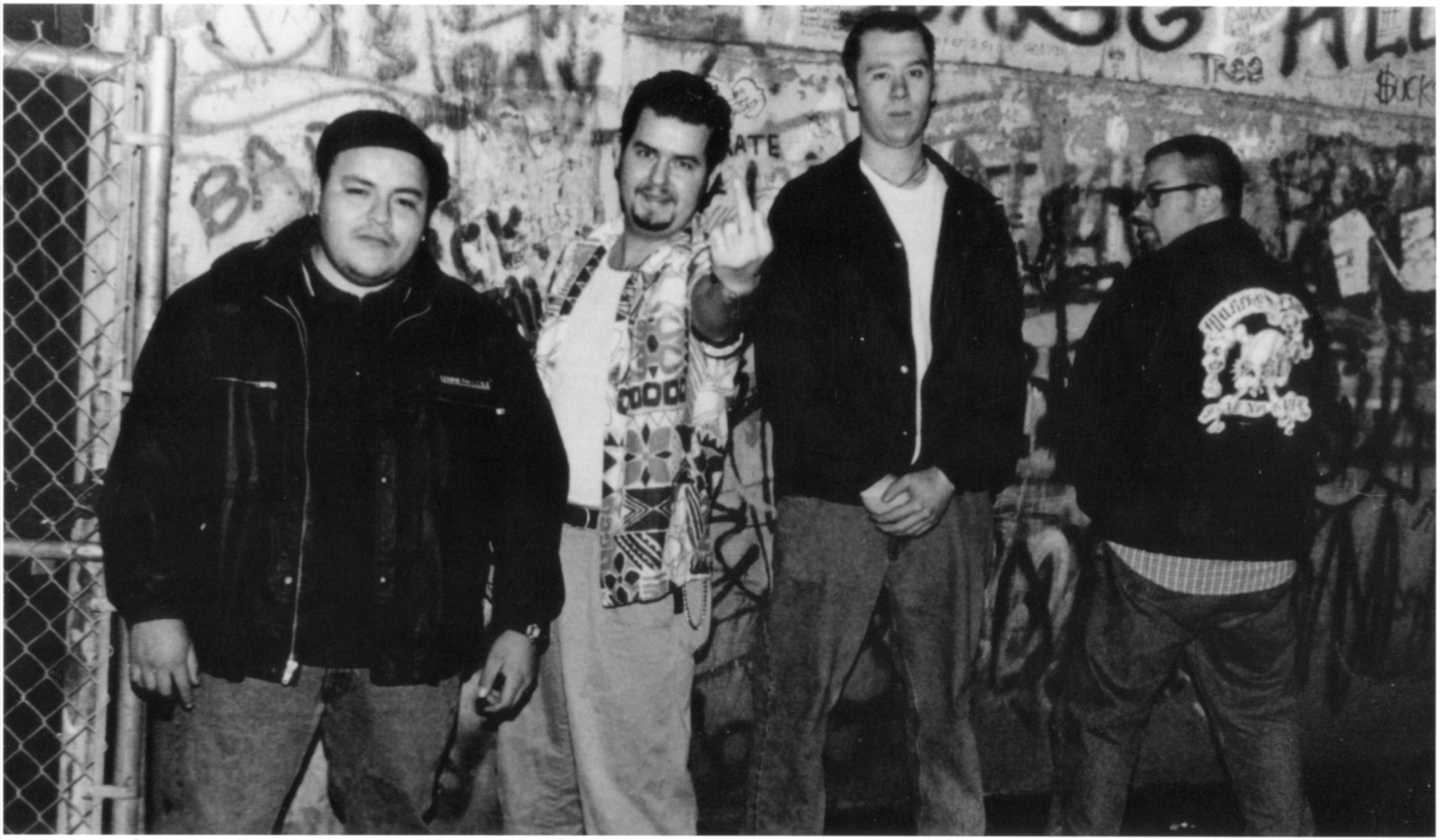
McFarland (second from right), and other members of Blood For Blood.

Ian McFarland is an American musician, director, and producer of music videos. He was a bassist for the hardcore punk group Blood for Blood from 1997 to 2004, and then turned to film making as a career. He produced and directed Meshuggah's 2010 concert film Alive, and the music video for Killswitch Engage's Grammy-nominated 2013 song In Due Time".

In 2017, he directed a documentary about Agnostic Front called The Godfathers of Hardcore.
