= Drowningman =

American metalcore band

- Origin: Burlington, Vermont, U.S.
- Genres: Metalcore; post-hardcore; mathcore; emocore
- Years active: 1995–2002; 2004–2005; 2014; 2021–2023
- Labels: Hydra Head; Revelation; Equal Vision; ReIgnition; Thorp; Iodine
- Past members: Simon Brody; Denny Donovan; Javin Leonard; Todd Tomlinson; Josh Levy; Matt Roy; Joe Villemaire; Zach Martin; Josh Parent; Frank Smecker; Andrew Abromowitz; Dave Joyal; Jackson Jacques; Hans Olson; Jamie Durivage; Dan Bushey; Mikey Lemieux; Brian Curry; Daryl Rabidoux; Eric Burdo

Drowningman is an American metalcore/hardcore band from Burlington, Vermont that was active from 1995 to 2005. Formed in the fall of 1995 by Simon Brody, Denny Donovan, Javin Leonard, Dave Barnett and Todd Tomlinson, the band was heavily influenced by a variety of bands including the Promise Ring, Sunny Day Real Estate, Deadguy, Unbroken, Shotmaker, Unwound, and this musical amalgamation influenced the modern metalcore and mathcore musical subgenres.

== History ==
=== Formation (1995–1996) ===
Drowingman was formed in Burlington, Vermont, and played its first show in a basement at Hungerford Terrace on New Year's Eve of 1996. A first demo recording from early 1996 is included on the Learn to Let It Go retrospective released by ReIgnition Recordings in 2004. Hungerford Terrace is famous for its involvement in the Underground Railroad with Harriet Tumbman in the slavery days.

=== Hydra Head Records era (1997–1998) ===
By 1997, the band had begun playing throughout the Northeast. Frequently sharing bills with bands on the Boston-based Hydra Head Records (Converge, Cave In, Cable and Piebald), Drowningman soon joined the roster and their debut 7-inch EP Weighted and Weighed Down was released in 1997, and was followed by the LP Busy Signal at the Suicide Hotline in 1998 and a split EP with frequent tour-mates The Dillinger Escape Plan on the same label.

=== Revelation Records era (1999–2001) ===
By early 1999, the band was being courted by Revelation Records and was also talking to friends at Equal Vision Records. The band returned to the studio soon after the addition of Joe Villemaire, Matt Roy and Zach Martin. Hydra Head had become concerned with the revolving door policy and when the EP How They Light Cigarettes in Prison was presented to them, the reaction was underwhelming. Revelation Records expressed enthusiasm for the record and went on to release it in early 2000, initially shipping more copies than any previous Revelation EP.

Simon Brody described the emerging band on the Revelation Records website in the following fashion:

Burlington, Vermont might not be known as a hot spot for hardcore. Socialist mayors, monsters in nearby Lake Champlain, Phish, and filthy hippies maybe – but definitely not hardcore. Be that as it may, over the last several years, the aggressive music world has been waking up to Vermont's dirty little secret and most recent addition to the Revelation Records family, Drowningman. Not particularly proud of their backwoods heritage, Drowningman has been content in the common misconception that they were from Boston created by their handful of releases on Hydra Head Records. With each successive release, from 1997's debut 7-inch Weighted and Weighed Down, to 1998's Busy Signal At The Suicide Hotline LP, and 1999's incendiary split 7-inch with New Jersey's Dillinger Escape Plan, the band has expanded the parameters of their caustic blend of spastic metal/hardcore blasts and emotional, melodic interludes, and in turn put themselves, and maybe someday their home state, on the hardcore map.

— Simon Brody

A first full U.S. tour with The Dillinger Escape Plan was embarked on to support the release. Soon after returning, production of the Rock and Roll Killing Machine record began in Washington, D.C. at the Salad Days Studio. A great deal of technical difficulty was encountered; Simon Brody had claimed in interviews the stressed work environment caused the tempo of many of the songs to rush and that record lost some of the previous efforts melodic counterpoint. Still, it was well received, earning a 10/10 in respected extreme music magazine Terrorizer and finding its way into many publications' top ten lists for 2001.

Aside from making regular appearances at Hellfest, Krazy Fest, Monster Fest and The New England Metal and Hardcore Festival, Drowningman began touring extensively in support of this latest record. They toured with hardcore and metal bands as varied as Earth Crisis, Glassjaw, Shadows Fall, Darkest Hour and Twelve Tribes. However, projected gigs for early 2001 were curtailed when the group lost its drummer. By May 2001, road action was resumed with regular partners Darkest Hour on the "Bro-Down 2001" tour.

=== Later recordings and first breakup (2002) ===
The band then recorded an EP for Equal Vision Records which was released in 2002 entitled Drowningman Still Loves You.

Several tours followed, first with Thursday and Waterdown, later with Atreyu and Vaux. By September, the group announced they were to hook up with Converge and Playing Enemy for East Coast and Midwest gigs but backed out to prioritize songwriting.

Embroiled in contract disputes with Revelation Records the band went into God City Studios in early 2002 and recorded a series of improvised tracks for a final Revelation release tentatively and sarcastically entitled Best Record Ever. The instrumental tracks briefly circulated minus a 20-minute "meditation on a single riff" (a homage to the emerging and burgeoning stoner rock trend) and according to band members was never actually intended to be released.

Shortly after a particularly rowdy final performance on June 22, 2002, at Krazy Fest 5 in Louisville, Kentucky, the members of Drowningman parted ways.

=== Reunion and Don't Push Us When We're Hot (2004–2005) ===
Denny Donovan and Simon Brody revived Drowningman briefly, beginning with a 2005 trek with The Dillinger Escape Plan, Misery Signals, Every Time I Die and Zao.

Drowningman announced a Summer 2005 nationwide US trek with The Minor Times. Prior to the tour, they recorded what was to be their final album which was moderately well-received by some critics. Blabbermouth gave the album an 8/10, saying "DROWNINGMAN stays just clear of being classified as a traditional noisecore act. There's much that's entertaining, musically stimulating, and downright comedic on this album."

A promotional video for the track "White People Are Stupid" was directed by Joseph Patisall, which MTV premiered on October 15, 2005 with the abbreviated title "WPAS".

Before embarking on a tour to promote their new album, in October 2005 Drowningman former members rejoined the band, guitarist Frank Smecker and drummer Dave Joyal, the later having prior involvement during the Still Loves You EP. The band broke up permanently after recording a version of Black Flag's "Loose Nut", for the Reignition Records re-issue of the tribute album Black On Black.

When the tour for Don't Push Us When We're Hot commenced, the band became disgruntled by the poor organization of the tour and only made it three or four shows into the tour before breaking up the band for the second time.

In 2014, Drowningman reformed for three shows in the Northeast with the Rock and Roll Killing Machine lineup.

== Members ==
=== Final lineup ===
- Simon Brody – vocals (1998–2002, 2004–2005, 2014, 2021–2023)
- Javin Leonard – guitar (1996–2002, 2014, 2021–2023)
- Matt Roy – guitar (1999–2002, 2014, 2021–2023)
- Teej Maynard – guitar (2021–2023)

=== Former members ===
- Joe Villemaire – drums (1998–2000, 2014)
- Dave Barnett – bass (1996–2000, 2000–2002, 2014)
- Hans Olson – guitar (2004–2005)
- Jamie Durivage – bass (2004–2005)
- Brian Curry – drums (2004–2005)
- Dave Joyal – drums (2000–2002, 2005)
- Zack Martin – bass (1999)
- Daryl Rabidoux – guitar (1997–1999)
- Todd Tomlinson – drums (1996–1998)
- Denny Donovan – guitar (1996–1997)
- Josh Levy – bass (1996–1997)

== Discography ==
=== Studio albums ===
- Busy Signal at the Suicide Hotline (1998, Hydra Head)
- Rock and Roll Killing Machine (2000, Revelation)
- Don't Push Us When We're Hot (2005, Thorp)

=== Singles and EPs ===
- Weighted and Weighed Down 7-inch (1997, Hydra Head)
- Jim Fear/My First Restraining Order split 7-inch with The Dillinger Escape Plan (1999, Hydra Head)
- How They Light Cigarettes in Prison 7-inch/CDep (2000, Revelation)
- Drowningman Still Loves You 10-inch/CDep (2001, Equal Vision)

=== Compilation albums ===
- Learn to Let It Go: The Demos (2004, Law of Inertia)
