= Thorp Records =

American independent record label

- Genre: Hardcore punk, metalcore, post-hardcore, emo
- Country of origin: United States
- Official website: thorprecords.com

Thorp Records is an independent record label focusing originally and primarily on hardcore punk, based out of Pennsylvania.

== Bands ==
- Above This World
- All Else Failed
- Angel City Outcasts
- Ashers
- Awkward Thought
- Benumb
- Bionic
- Blood for Blood
- The Boils
- Brain Failure
- Breakdown
- Bulldog Courage
- Burning Bridges
- Clenched Fist
- Comin' Correct
- Conviction
- Crash and Burn
- Dead Serious
- Deluge
- Diehard Youth
- Discipline
- Drowningman
- Down to Nothing
- The Ducky Boys
- Edgewise
- Emmanuel.7
- Fall River
- The Final Burden
- Final Plan
- Forced Reality
- Fordirelifesake
- Forever Is Forgotten
- Gone Without Trace
- Hell Within
- How It Ends
- I Defy
- Ironbound
- Knuckledust
- Mad Sin
- Madball
- Mushmouth
- My Luck
- My Revenge
- My Turn to Win
- Natchez Shakers
- North Side Kings
- On the Outside
- Out Cold
- Out to Win
- Paint the Town Red
- Power Point
- Premonitions of War
- Pride Kills
- Punishment
- Ramallah
- Reaching Hand
- Refuse Resist
- Ryker's
- Scars of Tomorrow
- Sheer Terror
- Skare Tactic
- Slapshot
- Stampin' Ground
- Striking Distance
- Sugar Daddie
- Twenty Bulls Each
- Two Minutes Hate
- Voorhees
- The Wednesdays
- The Young and the Useless
