= Black Thorn (album) =

Studio album by Flatfoot 56
- Released: March 30, 2010
- Genre: Celtic Punk, Oi!
- Length: 37:26
- Label: Old Shoe
- Producer: Johnny Rioux

Flatfoot 56 chronology
Jungle of the Midwest Sea (2007)	Black Thorn (2010)	Toil (2012)

Black Thorn is the fifth studio album by the Chicago celtic punk band Flatfoot 56. It was released as a part of the tenth anniversary of the band's founding to mostly positive reviews by critics. The album, produced by Johnny Rioux, is the best selling Flatfoot 56 album so far entering the Billboard Heatseekers Chart at number two, after a week of sales.

== Track listing ==
No.	Title	Length
1.	"The Escape"	1:25
2.	"Black Thorn"	3:21
3.	"Born For This"	3:37
4.	"Courage"	3:54
5.	"Smoke Blower"	2:17
6.	"The Hourglass"	3:26
7.	"Shiny Eyes"	2:54
8.	"We Grow Stronger"	2:56
9.	"Son Of Shame"	2:46
10.	"Stampede"	2:44
11.	"You Won Me Over"	3:01
12.	"Way Of The Sun"	2:39
13.	"Hot Head"	2:31

== Reception ==
Professional ratings
Review scores
Source	Rating
Jesus Freak Hideout	4/5 stars
Indie Vision	8/10 stars
Dying Scene	5/5 stars
Stony Brook Independent	Mixed
Absolute Punk	80%
Alternative Press	3.5/5 stars

The album was received with mostly positive reviews from both the mainstream and the independent media. Several large media outlets including Alternative Press and HM reflected positively on the album. It was praised for its variety and maturity compared to Flatfoot 56's past albums. AMP noted that the album had a more mature sound than Flatfoot 56's past albums. Several reviewers noted that the album was written with mosh pits in mind. However, the album was criticized for its more polished sound that broke away from the band's punk roots embracing a more Dropkick Murphys like sound. Gavin McInnes has listed the album as one of the seven albums that changed his life saying, "I feel like these kids from the Southside of Chicago do the music of my adolescence even better than it was the first time around." McInnes also used the song "Courage" in the intro and outro of his show on Compound Media.

== Chart positions ==
=== Album ===
Year	Chart	Position
2010	The Billboard 200	160
2010	Christian Albums	11
2010	Heatseekers Albums	2
2010	Independent Albums	17
