= The Kickovers =

Early 2000s American pop punk band

- Origin: Boston, Massachusetts
- Genre: Pop punk
- Years active: 2001 – 2003
- Label: Fenway Recordings
- Past members: Nate Albert; Johnny Rioux; Jon McGarry; Jamie Vavra; Mikey Welsh; Joe Sirois

The Kickovers were a pop punk band formed by Nate Albert, former guitarist of The Mighty Mighty Bosstones.

After Nate left the Bosstones to go to Brown University, he started writing songs, which were not like his previous band. In 2001, he got a band together with Bosstones drummer Joe Sirois, short time Weezer bass player Mikey Welsh and another Boston, MA musician Johnny Rioux. They initially joined under the name The Brakes which they had to change because of a New Jersey band called The Break. That's when they took on the moniker The Kickovers.

They released their only album, Osaka, on April 23, 2002 on Fenway Recordings. Around the release of the album, Joe Sirois left because of the Bosstones schedule and new drummer Jamie Vavra took his place. They toured in support of their album opening for Local H.

They released a couple 7" vinyl singles through Fenway, Fake in Love and a split with The Damn Personals, whom the band toured with.

The Kickovers played their last show on April 14, 2003 in Cambridge, MA with Nerf Herder. The Kickovers members started working with Mike McColgan on his new band, the Street Dogs. Nate produced their album while Johnny played bass on it and original Kickovers drummer Joe played drums. Nate made a couple posts on the internet about the Kickovers recording a new EP, but that was never released and the band wasn't heard from again.

On October 9, 2011, it was announced that original bassist Mikey Welsh had been found dead in a Chicago, Illinois hotel room.

== Discography ==
Albums

- Osaka (2002)

Singles

- Fake in Love 7" (2002)
  - Includes "Fake in Love" from Osaka and the b-side "Don't Look Down"
- Damn Personals/The Kickovers Split 7" (2002)
  - Includes "Better Living" by The Damn Personals and "Mascara Queen" by The Kickovers

Compilations

- In Our Lifetime, Vol. 1 (2002)
  - Includes "Fake in Love" from Osaka
- In Our Lifetime Vol. 3: The Revenge of Boston (2002)
  - Includes the non-album track "Dirty Hands"
- Fat City Presents: Bands We Like 2 (2005)
  - Includes the b-side "Mascara Queen"; album was only available with Fat City Magazine Issue 9
