= Toiler =

Toiler, Toilers, The Toiler or The Toilers may refer to:

== Films ==
- The Toilers (1916 film), starring Nance O'Neill
- The Toilers (1919 film), starring Ronald Colman
- The Toilers (1928 film), featuring Douglas Fairbanks, Jr.

== Maritime vessels ==
- USS Toiler (ARS-47), a US Navy rescue and salvage ship that was cancelled
- Empire Toiler, an Empire ship transferred to Belgium in 1943
- Toiler, a commercial vessel built by British shipbuilder Swan Hunter, completed or launched in 1910

== Newspapers ==
- The Newcastle Argus and District Advertiser, an Australian newspaper later named The Toiler (1920-1921)
- Daily Worker, a Communist Party USA newspaper called the Toiler from 1919 to 1922
- The Toiler, an American 19th century newspaper founded and edited by Peter J. McGuire

== Sports ==
- Winnipeg Toilers, a former Senior "A" men's basketball team in Winnipeg, Manitoba, Canada
- Toiler, nickname of Ed Harrison (footballer) (1884-1917), Australian rules footballer
- Toiler, mascot and sports teams of Manual Arts High School, Los Angeles, California

== Other uses ==
- Trudoviks or Toilers, an early 20th century political party in Russia
- Toilers Mountain, Victoria Land, Antarctica

== See also ==
- Toil (disambiguation)
- Tillie the Toiler, an American newspaper comic strip from 1921 to 1959, as well as two films based on it
