= Crooked Drunken Sons =

EP by Street Dogs
- Released: April 20, 2013
- Recorded: November 2012
- Genre: Punk rock
- Label: Pirates Press

Street Dogs chronology
Street Dogs (2010)	Crooked Drunken Sons (2013)	Rustbelt Nation (2013)

Crooked Drunken Sons is an EP by the Street Dogs. It was released on 7" and as a digital download on Record Store Day, April 20, 2013, by Pirates Press Records. The title song is named after an annual tour the band has been doing. The songs were recorded in November 2012 at bassist Johnny Rioux's compound in Texas. The songs were originally meant to be demos for their next album, but the band liked them enough to release them as-is. One of the B-sides, "I Got Drunk", is an Uncle Tupelo cover.

== Track listing ==
=== Side A ===
1. "Crooked Drunken Sons" – 4:12

=== Side B ===
1. "I Got Drunk" – 2:10
2. "We All Fall Apart" – 2:26

== Credits ==
- Mike McColgan – vocals
- Johnny Rioux – bass
- Marcus Hollar – lead guitar
- Tobe Bean III – rhythm guitar
- Pete Sosa – drums
