= Toil (album) =

Studio album by Flatfoot 56
- Released: July 24, 2012
- Genres: Celtic punk, Christian punk, folk
- Length: 38:31
- Label: Paper + Plastick
- Producer: Johnny Rioux

Flatfoot 56 chronology
Black Thorn (2010)	Toil (2012)

Toil is a studio album by the Chicago Celtic punk band Flatfoot 56, released on August 14, 2012, by Paper + Plastick. The release is the fourth studio album released by the group since they were signed by a label. Johnny Rioux, a member of the Celtic punk band Street Dogs, returned as the producer.

The album was released to generally favorable reviews. Critics and fans enjoyed the album's diversity of sound and song writing. Reviewers described the album's songs as working-class anthems with Christian themes. The final track on the album, a Celtic punk cover of the hymn "I'll Fly Away", was well received by music critics. The album produced one single, "I Believe It", that was released as a music video. Both the album and the single failed to chart. The track "Winter in Chicago" was featured on the soundtrack for the video game Watch Dogs.

== Background and recording ==
While on tour in 2011, Flatfoot 56 played at Summerfest in Milwaukee with Less than Jake. Less than Jake drummer Vinnie Fiorello, owner of Paper + Plastick, saw the band play and was impressed by their energy and performance. When he discovered that the band was looking for a record label, he offered to sign them.

Johnny Rioux, who had produced Flatfoot 56's last album, Black Thorn, was chosen as the album's producer. The band felt that having the same producer improved communication and allowed the band to work more freely. According to frontman Tobin Bawinkel, this familiarity allowed Rioux to encourage the band to advance musically and think differently. During January 2012, the band recorded the entire album at the Atlas Studios in Chicago, Illinois.

== Writing and composition ==
The album's lyrics have been described as an anthematic examination of the struggles of the American working class and politically liberal. Along with highlighting the struggles of blue-collar America, the lyrics portray the idea that there is hope even when things appear to be bleak and that giving up is not an option. While there are Christian themes throughout the songs, neither Christian nor secular reviewers found them to be preachy.

"Brother, Brother", the first song on the album, is inspired by the band members' experience with the drug use of friends. Bawinkel stated in an interview that "a bunch of the tunes cover what we wanted to say to them during those times [when friends returned to using drugs]." Michael Weaver, writing for Jesus Freak Hideout, interpreted the song as an attempt to convince this individual to turn his or her life around and return to the Christian faith. The next track, named "The Rich, The Strong and The Poor", tells the story of three men looking for happiness. The first tries to find it in money, but he returns unfulfilled. The second tries looking for happiness in physical strength. He believes that if he proves himself, that he will find peace. Like the first man, he ends up unfulfilled. The final man looks for happiness in basic life needs and likewise ends up in the same position as the first two men. Bawinkel explains that, "all three are very much in the same position in that happiness hasn’t been found in chasing these various desires. There is something more which is hopeful for some and frustrating for others."

The third song on the album, "I Believe It", was the subject of the band's only music video from Toil. The video shows the band singing the song acoustically in the studio, much like the version that is featured on the album. Instrumentally, the song is guitar-driven and features the mandolin. The lyrics remind the listener to continue going forward even if it is painful. The song has been seen as symbol of the band's faith. The title track, "Toil", is an acoustic protest song that was compared by one reviewer to the Bruce Springsteen album Wrecking Ball. The lyrics tell the story of an unhappy, overworked, working-class man. The song ends with the lyrics, "I'm a slave to that whistle call. I’m a slave." The tenth song, "6'10"", is an alt-country ballad that was written in response to people making jokes about Bawinkle's height. The man depicted in the track is six feet one inch (1.85 meters) tall and has to deal with people questioning him about why he does not play basketball.

== Reception ==
Professional ratings
Review scores
Source	Rating
Absolute Punk	8/10
Alternative Press	3.5/5 stars
AMP Magazine	Positive
Consequence of Sound	4/5 stars
Jesus Freak Hideout	4.5/5 stars
Punk News	3.5/5 stars

Toil was received positively by reviewers, though the album and its single failed to chart. Absolute Punk's reviewer commented that the album was "fun" and a "rabble-rouser." Jesus Freak Hideout's reviewer thought Toil was Flatfoot 56's best work to date and that the album showed the band improving with age. Innocent Words' reviewer agreed with Jesus Freak Hideout's assessment, while David Von Bader, from Consequence of Sound, felt that the album was a step towards broader appeal.

The final song on the album was well received by reviewers. The song, a Celtic punk cover of "I'll Fly Away", is the band's take on a widely recorded traditional hymn. AMP's reviewer called the cover "perfectly-executed". Danny Exyle, writing for Punk News, called the song a "crowd favorite" for fans of the band's live show. Jesus Freak Hideout's reviewer viewed the release of another hymn on one of Flatfoot 56's albums very favorably; the band had covered "Amazing Grace" on an earlier album. He concluded stating "anyone who thought hymns were boring [has] not heard a Flatfoot 56 rendition."

== Track listing ==
1. Brother, Brother - 2:32
2. The Rich, The Strong and The Poor - 3:09
3. I Believe It - 2:44
4. Take Hold Again - 3:28
5. Toil - 3:37
6. Live or Die Trying - 3:24
7. Work For Them - 2:15
8. Terrorizing Truth - 2:45
9. Strongman - 2:56
10. 6'10 - 2:32
11. This Time - 3:15
12. Winter In Chicago - 3:10
13. I'll Fly Away - 2:44

== Personnel ==
Personnel as listed on Allmusic:

Flatfoot 56

- Tobin Bawinkel — guitar, vocals
- Justin Bawinkel — drums, vocals
- Kyle Bawinkel — bass, vocals
- Brandon Good — guitar, harmonica, mandolin, vocals
- Eric McMahon — bagpipes, guitar, vocals

Production and recording

- Johnny Rioux — producer
- Tim Rusin — mixing
- Justin Yates — engineer
- Stephen Egerton — mastering
- Albert E. Brumley — composer

Artwork and photography

- Ryan Besch — artwork
- Anthony Barlich — photography
- Chad Sengstock — photography

Guest musicians

- Jane Bawinkel — vocals
- Cuddy — vocals
- David Daniher — bagpipes
- Rebecca Faber — violin
- Maron Gaffron — vocals
- Dan Hanson — banjo
- Joby — cello
- Josh Robieson (ex-Flatfoot 56) — bagpipes
- Kevin Phlanz — vocals
- Robert Powell — tambourine, vocals
- Jon Pratt — vocals
- Johnny Rioux (Street Dogs) — vocals
- Ginger Rob — vocals
- Spider — upright bass
- Turbovamps — vocals
- Jimmy Wasion — piano
- Kyle Wilnewie — vocals

== References and bibliography ==
- "Flatfoot 56 Toil". AllMusic. Rovi Corporation. 2013.
- Exyle, Danny (2012). "Flatfoot 56 Toil". PunkNews.org.
- Flatfoot 56 (2012). "Flatfoot 56 Finish Recording New Album With Johnny Rioux At Atlas Studio; On Tour In Europe & Russia". Flatfoot 56. Archived from the original on August 23, 2012.
- "Flatfoot 56 Charts". Billboard.
- Housel, Kirsten (August 2012). "Review: Toil". Alternative Press. 27 (289). Cleveland.
- Moore, John B. (2012). "Flatfoot 56 Stepping Forward With Some Change on Toil". Innocent Words. Archived from the original on May 27, 2013.
- Shrum, Tony (2012). "Record Review: Flatfoot 56- Toil". AMP. IndieClick Music Network.
- Tsai, Matthew (2012). "Flatfoot 56 - Toil". Absolute Punk.
- Tuttle, Jonathan (2012). "Flatfoot 56: Toil". Innocent Words.
- Von Bader, David (2012). "Album Review: Flatfoot 56 – Toil". Consequence of Sound. IndieClick Music.
- Weaver, Michael (2012). "Flatfoot 56 Toil". Jesus Freak Hideout.
- "Welcome Flatfoot 56 to the Family". Paper + Plastick. 2011. Archived from the original on May 27, 2013.
- Zarrillo, Zack (2012). "POZ Track-By-Track: Flatfoot 56 - Toil". Property of Zack. Buzz Media.
