= Oh, Father =

Oh, Father may refer to:

== TV ==
- Oh, Father!, see Oh, Brother! (TV series)
- Oh! Father (film) (オー!ファーザー Ō! Fāzā), 2013 Japanese film based on the novel Oh! Father (オー!ファーザー Ō! Fāzā) by Kotaro Isaka 2010
- Oh Father, a character from The Boys

== Music ==
=== Albums ===
- Oh, Father!, 1956 jazz album by Earl Hines
- Oh, Father, 1994 album by Baha Men

=== Songs ===
- "Oh Father", 1989 song by Madonna
- Oh, Father, 1994 song by Baha Men, theme song from film My Father, The Hero
- Oh Father, 2006 song by Linda Sundblad, No.1 in Sweden
- Oh, Father, 2010 song by Street Dogs from Street Dogs (album)
