= Flatfoot 56 =

American punk band

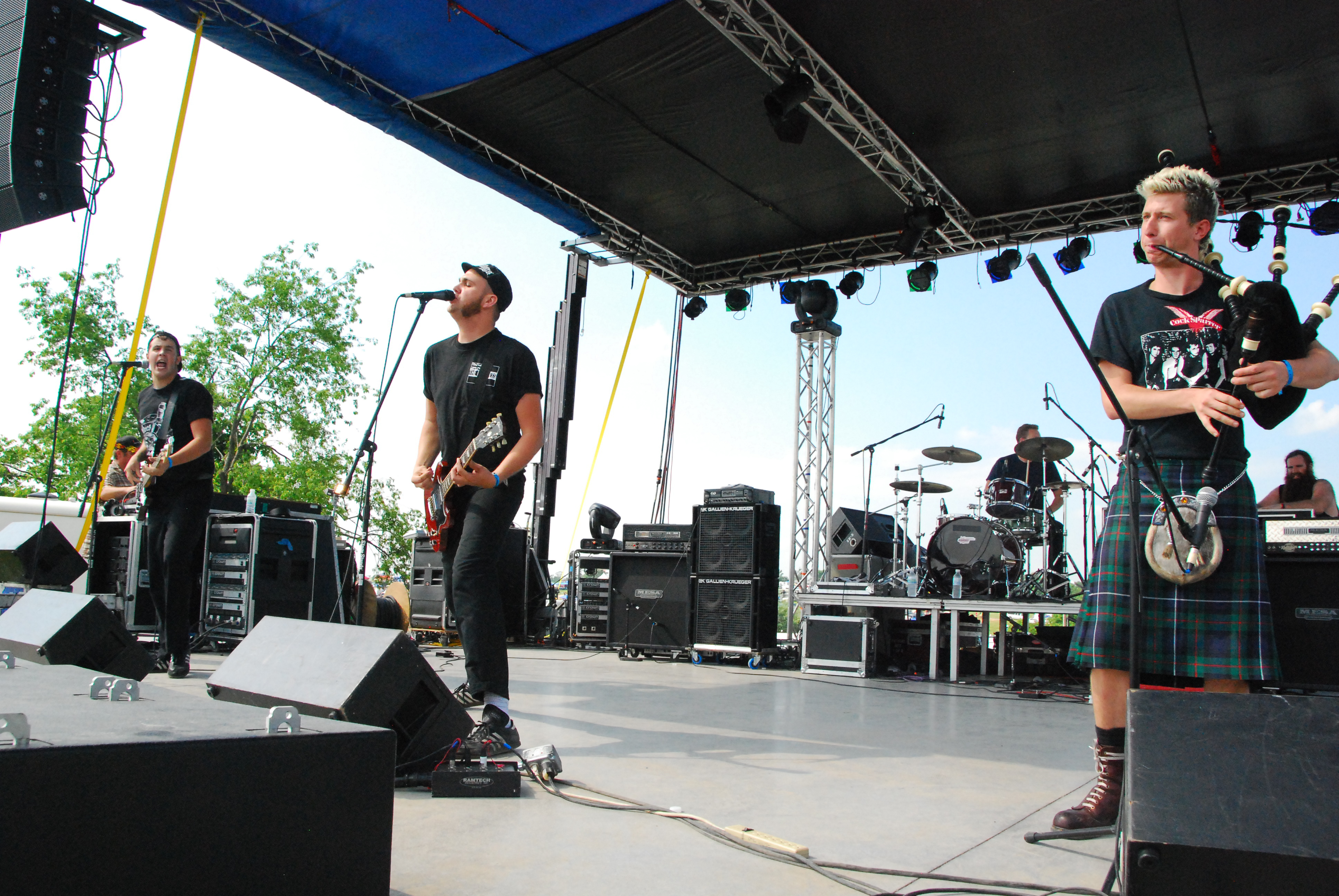
- Flatfoot 56 performing in 2009

Background information
- Origin: Chicago, Illinois, US
- Genres: Oi!, Celtic punk, hardcore punk, punk rock, Christian punk
- Years active: 2000–present
- Labels: Pirates Press, Flicker, Old Shoe, Paper + Plastick, Sailor's Grave
- Spinoffs: 6'10 (Tobin, Josh), Brick Assassin (Kyle), Sexually Frustrated (Kyle, Justin), The Uh Ohs (Josh), Fuerza Bruta (Kyle)
- Members: Tobin Bawinkel; Kyle Bawinkel; Keith Perez; Jon Nowicki; Josh Robieson
- Past members: Justin Bawinkel; Brandon Good; Conrad Allsworth; Eric McMahon
- Website: www.flatfoot56.com

Flatfoot 56 is an American Celtic punk band formed in Chicago, Illinois, in 2000. Known for their use of Scottish Highland bagpipes, the group performs an Oi! and Celtic punk sound similar to Dropkick Murphys and Flogging Molly. They have released seven studio albums and seven extended plays; their fifth album, Black Thorn (2010), debuted at No. 2 on the Billboard Heatseekers chart and No. 160 on the Billboard 200 at.

== History ==
=== 2000–2004: Origins, Rumble of 56, and Waves of War ===
Flatfoot 56 formed in Chicago, Illinois, in the summer of 2000, originally a three-piece punk band consisting of brothers Tobin, Justin, and Kyle Bawinkel. The brothers started writing songs together in the fall, and by the Christmas season they were playing their first concert. Josh Robieson (bagpipes, guitar, mandolin) joined the group in January 2001, adding Highland bagpipes and a second guitar to their sound.

Following a self-titled demo EP in 2001, the band recorded their first studio album, Rumble of 56, in the summer of 2002, at the Noise Chamber studio in Rockford, Illinois. Their second album, Waves of War, was released in 2003. Their song "That's OK" had heavy radio play on stations across the Midwestern United States. It has been known as one of the higher-rated songs Flatfoot 56 has ever played and is a crowd favorite at live performances.

=== 2004–2008: Knuckles Up, signing to Flicker, and Jungle of the Midwest Sea ===
In 2004, Flatfoot 56 performed at the Cornerstone Festival in Illinois for a crowd of about 700 people. It was at this concert that the band released their third album, Knuckles Up. It has been the band's best-selling record, and the group continues to record and tour. The band has been signed to Flicker Records and has re-released Knuckles Up through the label. Their fourth record, Jungle of the Midwest Sea, was released on May 15, 2007.

=== 2008–2011: Signing to Old Shoe and Black Thorn ===
After the release of Jungle, the band embarked on tours, appearing at festivals including Skanksgiving (2008), Sonshine Festival (2008, 2009, 2011), and Warped Tour. They also appeared on the Warped Tour's 2010 Tour Compilation album, and recorded a song for the Swingin Utters tribute album Untitled 21: A Juvenile Tribute to the Swingin' Utters.

In January 2009, the band announced on their website that they were recording a fifth album. On December 18 of the same year, it was officially announced that they had signed to the California-based Old Shoe Records for the release of their new album, Black Thorn. The album was initially due for release St. Patricks Day (March 17) 2010, but was delayed until March 30, 2010. Upon its release, the album debuted at No. 2 on Billboard Heatseekers New Artist Chart, and on the Billboard Top 200 at No. 160, among other Billboard charts. The video for the Black Thorn single "Courage" was nominated for a 2010 Chicago/Midwest Emmy Award for 'Best Director', and another album track, "Born For This", was featured on the Old Shoe compilation album Welcome to the Family Vol. 4. Black Thorn was included in Spin magazine's "List of 7 Life Changing Records".

=== 2011–2017: Signing to Paper + Plastick and Toil ===
While on tour in 2011, Flatfoot 56 played at Summerfest in Milwaukee with Less than Jake. Less than Jake drummer Vinnie Fiorello, owner of Paper + Plastick Records, saw the band play and was impressed by their energy and performance. When he discovered that the band was looking for a record label, he offered to sign them. Paper + Plastick officially announced the signing in October 2011. The band reteamed with Black Thorn producer Johnny Rioux, feeling the familiarity would allow them to work more freely, and recorded the album in January 2012 at Atlas Studios in Chicago. The album, Toil, was released on July 30, 2012 and received favorable reviews from Alternative Press and AbsolutePunk, with the latter writing: "It's not every day you come across a Christian group that's unabashedly liberal politically. On Toil, it's much less a gimmick and much more a reflection of the band's genuity – their working class roots and the ability they have to combine faith, culture and song to stand up for them. That, to me, deserves a respect that runs deeper than the freshness, or lack thereof, of a melody."

=== 2017–2022: Sailor's Grave, Odd Boat, and other recordings ===
In 2017, the band crowdfunded a seventh studio album, Odd Boat, released through Sailor's Grave Records. The record spawned two singles, "Cain" and the title track. The group also released an EP, The Vancouver Sessions, through Sailor's Grave the following year.

In 2022, the band released a split EP with The Rumjacks, spawning the singles "Mud" and "Sorry".

=== 2026: Signing to Pirates Press Records ===
On June 4, 2026 the band announced their official signing to Pirates Press Records.

== Side projects ==
Bassist Kyle Bawinkel sings for the hardcore side project Sexually Frustrated.

== In popular culture ==
The Flatfoot 56 songs "Shiny Eyes", "Son of Shame", and "We Grow Stronger" were featured in the third season of the FX drama series Sons of Anarchy.

Flatfoot 56 also performed two tracks for WWE: Johnny Curtis's theme, "I Told You So", and a version of Irish-born wrestler Sheamus's theme, "Written In My Face".

== Members ==
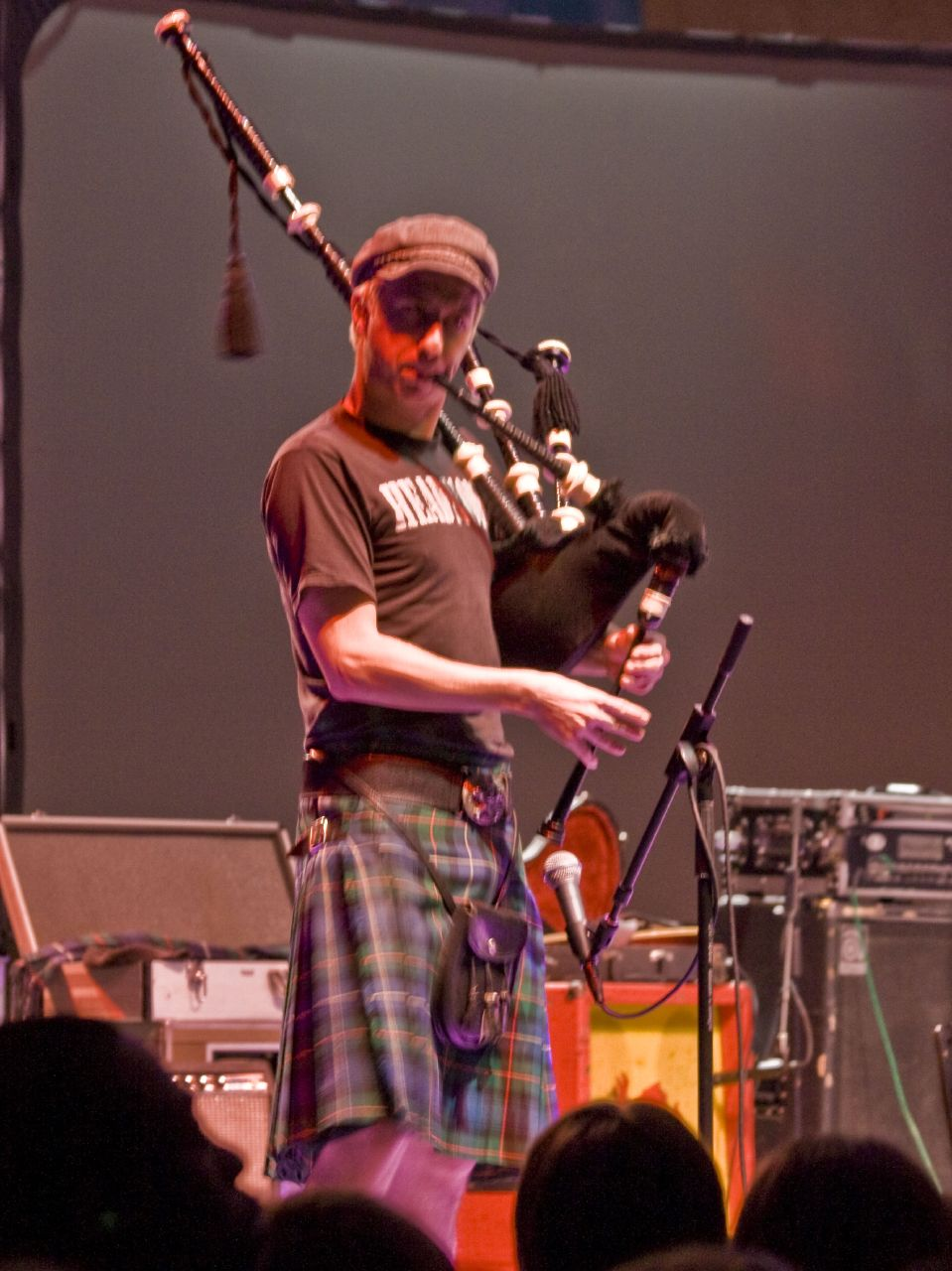
Josh Robieson, the bagpiper of Flatfoot 56

=== Current ===
- Tobin Bawinkel – lead vocals, rhythm guitar
- Kyle Bawinkel – bass, vocals
- Dan Alfonsi – drums
- Josh Robieson – bagpipes, mandolin

=== Former ===
- Justin Bawinkel – drums, vocals
- Brandon Good – mandolin, guitar, vocals
- Conrad Allsworth – drums
- Adam Christiansen – guitar (touring member)
- Eric McMahon – bagpipes, guitar, bass drum

== Discography ==
=== Studio albums ===
| Year | Title | Chart positions | | | | Label |
| Year | Title | Billboard 200 | Christian Albums | Heatseekers Albums | Independent Albums | Label |
|---|---|---|---|---|---|---|
| 2002 | Rumble of 56 | – | – | – | – | independent |
| 2003 | Waves of War | – | – | – | – | independent |
| 2004 | Knuckles Up | – | – | – | – | independent; Flicker (re-release) |
| 2007 | Jungle of the Midwest Sea | – | – | – | – | Flicker |
| 2010 | Black Thorn | 160 | 11 | 2 | 17 | Old Shoe |
| 2012 | Toil | – | – | – | – | Paper + Plastick |
| 2017 | Odd Boat | – | – | – | – | Sailor's Grave |

=== EPs ===
| Year | Title | Label |
|---|---|---|
| 2001 | Flatfoot 56 | independent |
| 2006 | The EP | Flicker |
| 2007 | The Sounds of Midway | Flicker |
| 2012 | I Believe It | Paper + Plastick |
| 2015 | Flatfoot 56 / 6'10 | Flix Records |
| 2018 | The Vancouver Sessions | Sailor's Grave |
| 2022 | The Rumjacks / Flatfoot 56 | Figure Four |

=== Singles ===
| Year | Song | Album |
|---|---|---|
| 2006 | "Brotherhood" | Knuckle Up |
| 2006 | "This Town" | Knuckle Up |
| 2006 | "Loaded Gun" | Jungle of the Midwest Sea |
| 2007 | "Warriors | Jungle of the Midwest Sea |
| 2009 | "The Hourglass" | Black Thorn |
| 2010 | "Courage" | Black Thorn |
| 2012 | "I Believe It" | Toil |
| 2017 | "Stutter" | Odd Boat |
| 2017 | "Odd Boat" | Odd Boat |
| 2018 | "Cain | The Vancouver Sessions |
| 2022 | "Mud" | The Rumjacks / Flatfoot 56 |
| 2022 | "Sorry" | The Rumjacks / Flatfoot 56 |

=== Music videos ===
| Year | Song | Director |
|---|---|---|
| 2006 | "Brotherhood" | |
| 2006 | "This Town" | |
| 2006 | "Loaded Gun" | |
| 2007 | "Warriors | |
| 2009 | "The Hourglass" | Bryan Buchelt |
| 2010 | "Courage" | Kendal Miller |
| 2012 | "I Believe It" | |
| 2017 | "Stutter" | Bryan Buchelt |
| 2017 | "Odd Boat" | James Gregory Wightman |
| 2018 | "Cain | JLS Collective |
| 2022 | "Mud" | Elijah Settles |
| 2022 | "Sorry" | |

== Awards ==
| Year | Nominee / work | Award | Result |
|---|---|---|---|
| 2008 | Jungle of the Midwest Sea | Rock Album of the Year (Dove Award) | Nominated |
| 2010 | "Courage" | Outstanding Achievement for Individual Excellence Off Camera | Nominated |
