= Mike McColgan =

American Singer

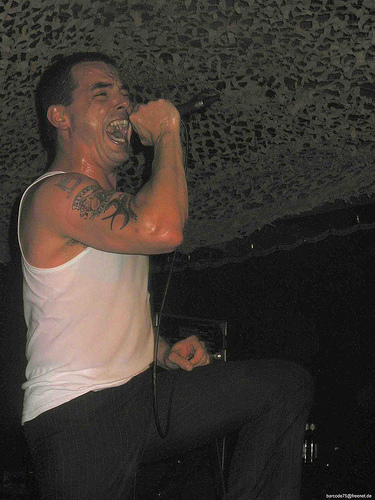
Mike McColgan (2005)

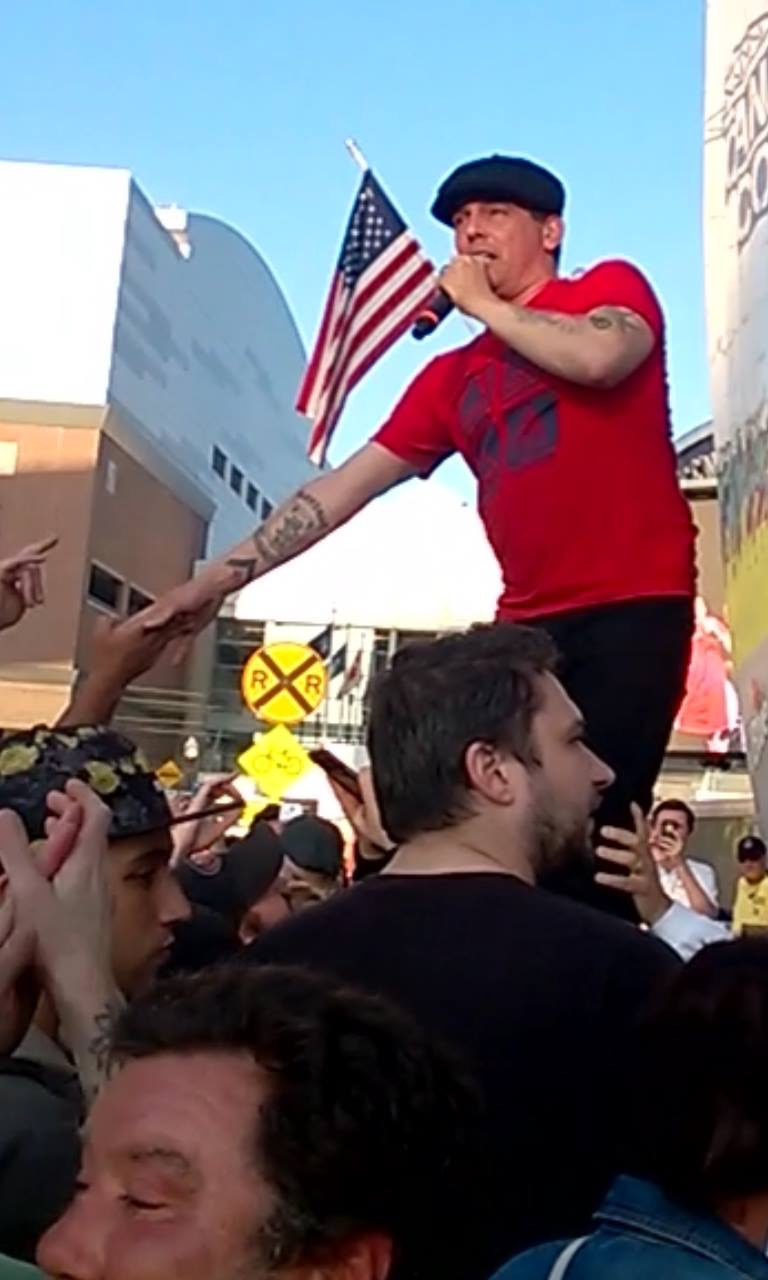
Mike McColgan (2015)

Michael McColgan is an American musician, and is a founding member and lead singer of the American punk band Street Dogs and a founding member and former original lead singer of the American Celtic punk band Dropkick Murphys. He currently is the lead singer of Michael McColgan and the Bomb Squad.

== Early years and Dropkick Murphys ==
McColgan was born in the Savin Hill area of Dorchester, Massachusetts, and attended Catholic Memorial High School in West Roxbury, Massachusetts. His interest in music began while he sang in the school's choir. McColgan joined the U.S. Army in 1989 and served in 4th Battalion 82nd Field Artillery, Charlie Battery in the first Gulf War before becoming a founding member of the Dropkick Murphys in 1996. While McColgan was with the Murphys, they released one full-length album, Do or Die.

According to McColgan, he always wanted to be a member of the Boston Fire Department like his uncle and role-model, Kevin O'Toole (the subject of "Kevin J. O'Toole" on State of Grace). When McColgan left the band in 1998 to pursue this dream, he was replaced as lead singer by Al Barr, ex-vocalist for The Bruisers. Regarding his 1998 departure, McColgan said "I have no misgivings, no regrets…and there are no bad feelings...I still talk to those guys." The song "Two Angry Kids" on State of Grace is reportedly a reminiscing of the times spent with Dropkick Murphys frontman Ken Casey.

== Street Dogs, FM359 and Michael McColgan and the Bomb Squad ==
McColgan in 2002 started a new band, Street Dogs, and shortly left the fire department to again pursue music full-time. The Street Dogs featured members such as Johnny Rioux and Joe Sirois (of the Mighty Mighty Bosstones). Guitarist Marcus Hollar sent McColgan an e-mail saying that if his new band ever needed a guitarist, that he was available. McColgan gave Hollar an audition and asked him to join the band.

The Street Dogs toured with Social Distortion, Flogging Molly, Tiger Army, The Bouncing Souls, The Adolescents, The Offspring, The Bones, The Swingin' Utters, and Anti-Flag. They also appeared on Warped Tour and had a successful headlining tour at the end of 2005. The band's third album, Fading American Dream, was released October 24, 2006. In support of the album, the band went out on The Gold Tour from October through December with The Bouncing Souls. In February 2008, it was announced that the Street Dogs signed on to Hellcat Records and the band released their fourth album, State of Grace, on July 8, 2008. The Street Dogs released their fifth studio album, Street Dogs, on August 31, 2010.

In 2013, McColgan announced a new project, FM359, with Johnny Rioux and founding Dropkick Murphys guitarist Rick Barton. FM359 is considered a non-religious gospel project, and their debut full-length, Truth, Love and Liberty, was released on January 14, 2014 through Pirates Press Records.

On February 13, 2020, McColgan and Rioux issued a statement via Facebook announcing that Street Dogs were disbanding after 17 years. The group announced a small St. Patrick's Day tour with Flogging Molly and Mad Caddies as well as two headlining shows in March 2020 in Long Beach, CA, with their final show being held in their hometown of Boston, MA; however, all of the shows were cancelled due to the COVID-19 pandemic.

On July 13, 2024, via the band's Instagram page, Street Dogs hinted towards something being announced the following week. On July 17, 2024, the band would be announced as the replacement for Sick of It All for the Saturday date of NOFX's final Massachusetts appearances. Additionally, Street Dogs played a club show on August 8, 2024 at The Middle East in Cambridge, Massachusetts as a way to warm up the weekend towards the festival show. This marked the first time the band has played together since 2020. On March 28, 2025, the band announced the Street Dogs Forever European tour from June to July 2025.

On March 17, 2025, Michael McColgan and the Bomb Squad performed the Dropkick Murphys' debut album Do or Die in its entirety along with some Street Dogs songs at a special St. Patrick's Day performance in Long Beach, CA.

On July 3, 2026, Michael McColgan and the Bomb squad released a cover of Warren Zevon's "Roland the Headless Thompson Gunner" to streaming services. The song will be the first of five new songs released by the group with the other four being originals and they will released in the weeks following the first song's release. The group consists of McColgan, founding Dropkick Murphys guitarist Rick Barton, Johnny Rioux, Rhys Kill, Paul Rucker and Rob Rogers.

== Discography ==
Dropkick Murphys

- Oi!/Skampilation 3. (1997) (Produced By Derek TC NYSR)
- Boys on the Docks EP (1997)
- Do or Die (1998)
- The Singles Collection, Volume 1 (2000, contains material released before Do or Die)

Street Dogs

- Savin Hill (2003)
- Street Dogs/The Dents Split (2004)
- Tales of Mass Deception EP (2004)
- Back to the World (2005)
- Fading American Dream (2006)
- State of Grace (2008)
- Street Dogs (2010)
- Crooked Drunken Sons (2013)
- Rustbelt Nation (2013)
- Street Dogs/Noi!se Split (2014)
- Stand for Something or Die for Nothing (2018)

FM359

- Truth, Love, & Liberty (2014)

Mike McColgan and the Bomb Squad

- "Roland the Headless Thompson Gunner" (2026)

Guest Appearances

- The Bones (Sweden) Featured in: "Yesterday's Heros" - Partners In Crime Vol. 1 (2006)
- Whole Wheat Bread: guest vocals on "Bombs Away" from the album Hearts of Hoodlums (2009)
- Happy Wags: lead vocals on "Firefighters" from the self-titled album (2014)
