= State of Grace (album) =

Studio album by Street Dogs
- Released: July 8, 2008
- Recorded: 2008
- Genre: Punk rock
- Length: 35:15
- Label: Hellcat
- Producer: Ted Hutt

Street Dogs chronology
Fading American Dream (2006)	State of Grace (2008)	Street Dogs (2010)

Professional ratings
Review scores
Source	Rating
Allmusic	3/5 stars

State of Grace is the fourth album by the Street Dogs. It was released on July 8, 2008. It was produced by Ted Hutt and is the band's first album on Hellcat Records. It includes a cover of The Skids' "Into the Valley". The album was released in Japan with an exclusive bonus track.

== Track listing ==
No.	Title	Length
1.	"Mean Fist"	2:30
2.	"Kevin J. O'Toole"	3:52
3.	"Into the Valley" (The Skids cover)	3:07
4.	"Rebel Song"	2:56
5.	"The General's Boombox"	3:38
6.	"Elizabeth"	3:05
7.	"Two Angry Kids"	2:29
8.	"Guns"	3:16
9.	"San Patricios"	2:49
10.	"A State of Grace"	3:46
11.	"Free"	3:39

Japan Bonus Track
No.	Title	Length
12.	"Townie Boys"

== Meanings of songs ==
According to McColgan, he always looked up to his uncle and role-model, Kevin O'Toole, who became the subject of "Kevin J. O'Toole."

The song "Two Angry Kids" is reportedly a reminiscing of the times spent with Dropkick Murphys bassist Ken Casey.

"San Patricios" is about a group of Irish immigrants who defected from the United States Army during the Mexican-American War.

"The General's Boombox" is a song about and dedicated to Joe Strummer of The Clash

== Credits ==
- Mike McColgan – vocals
- Johnny Rioux – bass, backing vocals, mandolin, harmonica, acoustic guitar
- Marcus Hollar – lead guitar, backing vocals, dobro, pump organ, acoustic guitar
- Tobe Bean III - rhythm guitar, slide guitar, dobro
- Paul Rucker – drums
- Ted Hutt – producing
- Heather Waters - Vocals on "Elizabeth"
- Rudy Johnson - Vocals on "San Patricios"
- Dram - Bagpipes and drums on "Kevin J. O'Toole"
- Lorne Cousin - Bagpipes on "State Of Grace"
- Steve Sidelnyk - Marching Snare Drum on "State Of Grace"
- Gavin Watson - Photographer of cover art
