= Toil =

Toil means literally intensive work, and may refer to:

== Literature ==
- "Toil" (Shlonsky poem) (Hebrew: "Amal"), a 1928 Hebrew-language Zionist settler poem by Avraham Shlonsky
- Toil, an 1890 English translation of Timofei Bondarev's treatise The Triumph of the Farmer or Industry and Parasitism
- "Toil" (English: "Will"), a Gaelic poem by Seán Ó Ríordáin

== Music ==
- The Wings of Fire Vol.II: "Toil", a 1997 album by Philippe Leduc
- "Toil", a 2008 song by Warship from Supply and Depend
- Toil (album), a 2012 album by Flatfoot 56
  - "Toil", a 2012 song by Flatfoot 56 from the album Toil

== Law ==
- Time off in lieu of overtime payment, also known as comp time

== See also ==
- Paradox of toil
