= Minority Rules =

Studio album by Whole Wheat Bread
- Released: January 25, 2005
- Genre: Punk rock; skate punk
- Label: Fighting
- Producer: Darian Rundall

Whole Wheat Bread chronology
Minority Rules (2005)	Punk Life EP (2006)

Professional ratings
Review scores
Source	Rating
Allmusic	link

Minority Rules is the debut album by punk band Whole Wheat Bread. It was released on January 25, 2005, by Fighting Records. The CD contains three hidden tracks which are hip hop songs.

== Track listing ==
1. "Broke" – 2:15
2. "Loud & Clear" – 1:26
3. "Old Man Samson" – 1:55
4. "Miss Perfection" – 2:19
5. "Scar Your Lungs" – 2:23
6. "Police Song" – 2:28
7. "Holly" – 1:50
8. "No Future" – 2:14
9. "Feel Like Shit" – 3:14
10. "Overrated" – 1:46
11. "Miss the Bus" – 1:00
12. "1:11" – 1:11
13. "Stress in My Life"(hidden track) – 3:12
14. "Dirty South"(hidden track) – 2:41
15. "Throw Them Things Up"(hidden track) – 4:12

== Personnel ==
- Aaron Abraham – guitar, vocals
- Nick Largen – bass, vocals
- Joseph Largen – drums
