= Have Nots =

American band

- Origin: Boston, Massachusetts, United States
- Genres: Ska punk, punk rock
- Years active: 2006–present
- Labels: Paper + Plastick
- Members: Jon Cauztik; Matt Pruitt; Jameson Hollis; Steve Patton

The Have Nots are an American ska punk band from Boston, Massachusetts, consisting of Jon Cauztik (guitar, vocals), Matt Pruitt (guitar, vocals), Jameson Hollis (bass), and Steve Patton (drums).

== History ==
The band was formed in 2006, combining members of local bands Chicago Typewriter and Stray Bullets. Before ever releasing an album they played shows with Boston ska legends such as The Mighty Mighty Bosstones and Big D and The Kids Table.

The band initially released a demo before recording their debut album, Serf City USA, in 2009. The album was originally self-released and later attracted the attention of Vinnie Fiorello from Paper + Plastick Records, who received a copy from Steve Foote of Big D and The Kids Table. Paper + Plastick subsequently released CD and vinyl versions of the album, while the band made it available for free as an MP3 download.

After the album was released the band was selected to play in that year's WBCN Rock & Roll Rumble, and went on tours with the Dropkick Murphys, Anti-Flag, Street Dogs, and Swingin Utters. In late 2010 they did their own tour of Europe.

In May 2011, the band released their second album Proud. The album was produced by Teen Idols drummer Matt Drastic, and engineered by Descendents guitarist Stephen Egerton.

In 2013, Matt Pruitt became the new guitarist for Street Dogs.

== Discography ==
- Serf City USA (2009) (Paper + Plastick)
- Proud (2011) (Paper + Plastick)

== Videography ==
- "One in Four" (2009)
- "Poisoned Antidote" (2010)
- "Used to Be" (2010)
- "Louisville Slugger" (2011)
- "Proud" (2011)
