= Fading American Dream =

Studio album by Street Dogs
- Released: October 24, 2006
- Recorded: 2006
- Genre: Punk rock
- Length: 42:48
- Label: Brass Tacks
- Producer: Ted Hutt

Street Dogs chronology
Back to the World (2005)	Fading American Dream (2006)	State of Grace (2008)

Professional ratings
Review scores
Source	Rating
Absolutepunk.net	(93%) link
Allmusic	link

Fading American Dream is the third album by Street Dogs. It was released on October 24, 2006 by Brass Tacks Records, a division of DRT Entertainment.

The album was released both with and without a bonus DVD.

== Track listing ==
All songs by Street Dogs (Mike McColgan, Johnny Rioux, Marcus Hollar, Joe Sirois and Tobe Bean) unless otherwise noted.

1. "Common People" – 4:07
2. "Not Without a Purpose" – 3:15
3. "Fatty" (Paul Delano) – 3:17
4. "Decency Police" – 2:26
5. "There Is Power in a Union" (Billy Bragg cover) – 3:36
6. "Tobe's Got a Drinking Problem" – 3:40
7. "Shards of Life" – 2:47
8. "Sell Your Lies" – 2:07
9. "Rights to Your Soul" – 3:28
10. "Hard Luck Kid" – 3:48
11. "Fading American Dream" – 2:54
12. "Final Transmission" – 4:20
13. "Katie Bar the Door" – 3:03

== Credits ==
- Mike McColgan – vocals
- Johnny Rioux – bass, backing vocals, mandolin, harmonica, acoustic guitar
- Marcus Hollar – lead guitar, backing vocals, dobro, pump organ, acoustic guitar
- Tobe Bean - rhythm guitar, slide guitar, dobro
- Joe Sirois – drums
- James Fearnley – tin whistle on "Shards of Life"
- Matt Hensley – accordion on "Shards of Life"
- Ted Hutt – E bow guitar on "Shards of Life", slide guitar on "Final Transmission", acoustic guitar on "Katie Bar the Door", backing vocals
- Joe Gittleman – backing vocals
- Leonard Sanford – backing vocals
- Donald McColgan – backing vocals
