= Stand for Something or Die for Nothing =

Studio album by Street Dogs
- Released: June 22, 2018
- Recorded: 2018
- Studio: Woolly Mammoth Studios; Sugarland Studio; Q Division Studio
- Genre: Punk rock; street punk; Oi!
- Label: Century Media
- Producer: Johnny Rioux

Street Dogs chronology
Rustbelt Nation (2014)	Stand for Something or Die for Nothing (2018)

Stand for Something or Die for Nothing is the sixth and final album by the Street Dogs. It was released on June 22, 2018. The album marks the band's first full-length album in eight years and first for the Century Media label. The only album to feature Pete Sosa on drums, Matt Pruitt on lead guitar and Lenny Lashley on rhythm guitar. The album features a guest appearance by Boston hip hop artist and actor, Slaine, on the song "Angels Calling".

Singer Mike McColgan said of the album "The dumbing down of America is a reason to write songs in 2018. The theme is wake the fuck up and the working class needs to unite across all colors, creeds, nationalities, genders and realize that we are being pitted against each other by snake oil salesmen and autocrats. From freedom of speech (“Stand for Something or Die for Nothing") to living The American Dream ("Working Class Heroes") to getting back on track ("The Comeback Zone") – Stand for Something or Die for Nothing raises political awareness and injects optimism into those who have doubts about their future and the current administration

== Track listing ==
No.	Title	Length
1.	"Stand for Something or Die for Nothing"	3:23
2.	"Other Ones"	2:52
3.	"The Comeback Zone"
4.	"Angels Calling (featuring Slaine)"
5.	"These Ain't the Old Days"
6.	"Working Class Heroes"
7.	"Lest We Forget"
8.	"The Round Up"
9.	"Mary on Believer Street"
10.	"Never Above You, Never Below You"
11.	"Torn and Frayed"

== Personnel ==
- Mike McColgan – vocals
- Johnny Rioux – bass
- Pete Sosa – drums
- Matt Pruitt – lead guitar
- Lenny Lashley – rhythm guitar

== Charts ==
Chart (2018)	Peak position
German Albums (Offizielle Top 100)	86
