= Street Dogs (Street Dogs album) =

Studio album by Street Dogs
- Released: August 31, 2010
- Recorded: 2010
- Genre: Punk rock, street punk, Oi!
- Label: Hellcat
- Producer: Johnny Rioux and Rick Barton

Street Dogs chronology
State of Grace (2008)	Street Dogs (2010)	Crooked Drunken Sons (2013)

Street Dogs is the fifth album by the Street Dogs. It was released on August 31, 2010. The band recorded the album at the Blasting Room in February 2010. The track "Rattle and Roll" was released on the compilation Epitaph New Noise, Volume 1. The album includes a re-recording of "Fighter", one of the band's most popular songs from their debut album, Savin Hill. This was the final album to feature Paul Rucker on Drums.

== Track listing ==
No.	Title	Length
1.	"Formation"	0:43
2.	"Rattle and Roll"	1:50
3.	"Up the Union"	2:29
4.	"Punk Rock and Roll"	2:35
5.	"The Shape Of Other Men"	2:24
6.	"Yesterday"	2:26
7.	"Too Much Information"	1:43
8.	"Bobby Powers"	2:41
9.	"In Stereo"	2:43
10.	"Hang 'Em High"	1:20
11.	"Ghosts"	2:18
12.	"Harpo"	2:12
13.	"10 Wood Rd."	2:21
14.	"Portland"	2:21
15.	"Freedom"	1:33
16.	"Oh Father"	2:53
17.	"Fighter"	3:12
18.	"Poor, Poor Jimmy"	3:00
19.	"Ballad of Detroit (deluxe digital download bonus track)"
20.	"Greed (deluxe digital download bonus track)"
21.	"Pedestal (deluxe digital download bonus track)"

== Personnel ==
- Mike McColgan – vocals
- Johnny Rioux – bass
- Marcus Hollar – lead guitar
- Tobe Bean III – rhythm guitar
- Paul Rucker – drums
