= Pirates Press =

- Founded: 2004
- Founder: Eric Mueller
- Headquarters: Emeryville, California
- Website: www.piratespress.com

Pirates Press is a vinyl broker located in Emeryville, California, that was founded in 2004. The company was started in the bedroom of owner Eric Mueller and has grown into a full-scale operation that now includes offices in Emeryville, California, New Jersey, and the Czech Republic. It is the manufacturing and production wing of its sister company Pirates Press Records.

== Company history ==
Pirates Press was founded in 2004 by Eric “Skippy” Mueller in San Francisco, California. Mueller started Pirates Press with the intent to ‘protect independent labels, bands, artists and businesses from being swindled and handicapped by big corporate manufacturers who really don’t care about them.’” The company has seen 75-100% yearly growth since its inception. In 2005, Pirates Press produced about 250,000 vinyl. In 2008, the company produced around 1.75 million vinyl for its customers. In 2009, Pirates Press produced over 2 million records for its customers. Clients include Tom Petty, White Stripes, Beck, Slayer, Eric Clapton, Madonna, and more.

Pirates Press is a vinyl broker, which means that they do not physically make any records themselves - product is pressed by GZ Media in the Czech Republic.
