= Hearts of Hoodlums =

Studio album by Whole Wheat Bread
- Released: January 20, 2009
- Genre: Punk rock
- Label: Fighting

Professional ratings
Review scores
Source	Rating
Bombshellzine.com	9/10 stars

Hearts of Hoodlums is the second full-length album by the punk band Whole Wheat Bread. It was released on January 20, 2009, though it became available to download on iTunes on January 6, 2009. This album is said to have received help from Lil Jon, Tim Armstrong, Murs, and Mike McColgan.

== Track listing ==
1. "Bombs Away" 3:38
2. "Throw Your Sets Up" 3:41
3. "Girlfriend Like This " 3:29
4. "Lower Class Man " 2:00
5. "I Can’t Think" 3:35
6. "Ode 2 Father " 2:57
7. "Staying True" 3:22
8. "Bloodstains & Bitemarks" 4:09
9. "Every Man for Himself" 2:43
10. "New Age Southern Baptist Nigga from da Hood" 1:14
11. "Catch 22" 2:57
12. "Stuck in da Dark" 3:08

For some fans that purchased the album ahead of time online there was a problem with shipping the disc. Those fans were offered a free download from the Fighting Records website. That version of the album featured 13 tracks. The fourth track was Ghost Muzik, featuring Lil Jon. All the other tracks remained the same.

== Personnel ==
- Aaron Abraham – guitar, vocals
- Will Frazier – bass, vocals
- Joseph Largen – drums

== Additional musicians ==
- Mike McColgan – vocals on "Bombs Away"
- Murs – vocals on "Stuck In Da Dark"
