= Savin Hill (album) =

Studio album by Street Dogs
- Released: September 23, 2003
- Recorded: 2003
- Genre: Punk rock
- Length: 41:06
- Label: Crosscheck Records
- Producer: Nate Albert

Street Dogs chronology
Savin Hill (2003)	Back to the World (2005)

Professional ratings
Review scores
Source	Rating
AllMusic	link

Savin Hill is the first album by punk band Street Dogs. This is the first new material featuring lead singer Mike McColgan since he quit Dropkick Murphys in 1998. The album is named after Savin Hill, a small area within the Dorchester neighborhood of Boston, Massachusetts.

The album includes two covers, of Kris Kristofferson's "The Pilgrim: Chapter 33" and Sham 69's "Borstal Breakout". Dicky Barrett from the Mighty Mighty Bosstones provides guest vocals on the track "Justifiable Fisticuffs" and former Murphys bandmate Ken Casey and Mike's Murphys replacement Al Barr provide guest vocals on the track "Stand Up."

Casey was due to produce the album but his busy schedule with the Dropkick Murphys didn't allow him to. A video for the single "Savin Hill" was also released.

== Track listing ==
1. "Savin Hill" (Rob Guidotti, Mike McColgan) – 3:24
2. "Cutdown on the 12th" (Jeff Erna, Guidotti, McColgan) – 2:36
3. "Star" (Guidotti) – 2:37
4. "Fighter" (Nate Albert, McColgan) – 3:04
5. "The Pilgrim: Chapter 33" (Kris Kristofferson) – 2:17
6. "Justifiable Fisticuffs" (Street Dogs) – 3:22
7. "Stand Up" (Guidotti) – 2:21
8. "When It Ends" (Guidotti) – 2:56
9. "Don't Preach to Me" (Guidotti, McColgan) – 2:12
10. "2 Bottles" (McColgan, Johnny Rioux) – 1:54
11. "Declaration" (McColgan, Rioux) – 2:21
12. "Jakes" (Giudotti, McColgan) – 2:45
13. "Last Call" (Giudotti) – 3:08
14. "Borstal Breakout" (Dave Guy Parsons, Jimmy Pursey) – 2:00
15. "Modern Day Labor Anthem" (Erna, Guidotti, McColgan) – 4:09
16. "Locked & Loaded" (vinyl-only bonus track)

== Personnel ==
- Mike McColgan – vocals
- Rob Guidotti – guitar
- Johnny Rioux – bass
- Jeff Erna – drums
- Al Barr – guest vocals on "Stand Up"
- Ken Casey – guest vocals on "Stand Up"
- Dicky Barrett – guest vocals on "Justifiable Fisticuffs"
