= Whole Wheat Bread (band) =

American rock band

- Origin: Jacksonville, Florida, United States
- Genres: Punk rock; pop punk; hardcore punk
- Years active: 2003–present
- Label: Fighting
- Members: Aaron Abraham; Joseph Largen; Will Frazier
- Past members: Nick Largen; C.J. Randolph; Timothy Connors; Andre Abraham
- Website: www.wholewheatbreadmusic.com

Whole Wheat Bread is an American rock band from Jacksonville, Florida, United States. They formed in 2003 and have so far released two albums and one EP, under the Orlando-based record label Fighting Records.

== History ==
Aaron Abraham and Nicholas Largen were friends from Jacksonville, Florida. Abraham knew about Largen, a.k.a. DJ Dirtee $skeet through the Jacksonville underground rap scene in which Largen was well known. They met up and decided to form a rap group. But Whole Wheat Bread needing members was then filled by Largen and his brother. With Abraham on vocals and guitar and Largen on bass, Largen's brother Joseph was brought in to play drums, opting out of a career in neurosurgery, and Whole Wheat Bread continued to play shows and record.

Their first album, Minority Rules, came out in January 2005 on Fighting Records. The album was produced by Darian Rundall, who had previously worked with other punk bands such as Pennywise and Yellowcard. The album reached No. 8 on Billboard's Top Heatseekers chart. In support of this record, they went on tour with bands such as MxPx, The Suicide Machines, Reel Big Fish, Sloppy Meateaters and Streetlight Manifesto.

Bassist Nicholas Largen was arrested in Amherst, New York on counts of armed robbery after attempting to rob money from two locations in June 2006. It was then announced that he would be replaced by C.J. from El Pus. The band continued to tour with various acts, including The Bouncing Souls, Street Dogs, and Wu-Tang Clan's Killah Priest. They then released an EP, Punk Life, in November 2006, recorded before Largen's arrest. The EP included three original songs and three "crunk rock" covers of rap songs. One original track "Symbol of Hope" reflected the events of Hurricane Katrina and the government's lack of enthusiasm to respond to the events. The track also featured backing vocals by Jason Navarro of the Suicide Machines.

It was announced on October 11, 2007 that bass player C.J. Randolph parted ways with Whole Wheat Bread. Whole Wheat Bread now have a complete line-up with the addition of Will Frazier on bass. More touring occurred throughout 2007, when they also began working on their second full-length album. They worked with producer Travis Huff, who had previously worked with bands such as Fall Out Boy and Yellowcard, to produce the album (due out Summer 2008 but didn't come out until January 2009). Additionally, Whole Wheat Bread also had been working with rapper Lil' Jon on his anticipated solo album, Crunk Rock. The band contributed music, as well as producing tracks with many well-noted rappers.

They released their second album Hearts of Hoodlums on January 6, 2009. Musician's support of the band had continued with a fair share of a fan base as of 2011.

In 2012, Whole Wheat Bread released a free 6 collaboration EP with rapper Murs under the name "The Invincibles". The EP can be downloaded at Murs & Whole Wheat Bread Are The Invincibles [Free EP + Video]

On September 20, 2012, the band announced on their Facebook they would start working on their fifth release in November. It will be an independent release and they are recording it in a solar powered studio.

On October 12, 2016, dates were released on the band's Facebook page announcing dates of a release tour for their upcoming Punk Life 2 EP.

== Band members ==
=== Current ===
- Aaron Abraham – guitar, lead vocals
- Joseph Largen – drums, vocals
- Will Frazier – bass, vocals

=== Former ===
- Nick Largen – bass, vocals (2004–2006)
- C.J. Randolph – bass, vocals (2006–2007)
- Andre Abraham - bass, vocals (2002-2004)
- Tim Connors - drums (2002-2003)

== Discography ==
=== Studio albums ===
- Minority Rules (2005)
- Hearts of Hoodlums (2009)

=== EPs ===
- 1st EP (2003) (with Steve)
- 2nd EP (2004) (with Tim Connors)
- Punk Life (2006)
- Punk Life 2 (2016)

=== Collaborations ===
- Murs & Whole Wheat Bread Are The Invincibles EP (2009)
- Lil Jon - "Killas" from Crunk Rock (2010)
- Pat O'Brien - "Ghost" from Empty Airwaves (2013)
