= Osaka (album) =

Studio album by The Kickovers
- Released: April 23, 2002
- Genre: Pop punk
- Length: 33:21
- Label: Fenway Recordings
- Producer: Nate Albert, David Minehan

Professional ratings
Review scores
Source	Rating
Allmusic	link

Osaka is the only album put out by The Kickovers. It was released on April 23, 2002 on the Fenway Recordings record label.

Some promotional copies of Osaka went out with the band's original name, The Brakes. Shortly after, they had to change their name because of a New York City band called The Break.

The album includes one cover, "Hanging on the Telephone", which was originally performed by The Nerves, although a cover of it by Blondie was more popular. "The Good Life" is also the name of a Weezer song, so some fans may have expected it to be a cover, especially since bassist Mikey Welsh was a member of Weezer prior to The Kickovers. Although not a touring members, Dave Aarnoff of The Shods performed bass and Paul Buckley of the bands Orbit and Dear Leader played drums on several tracks of the album.

== Track listing ==
All songs by Nate Albert unless otherwise noted.

1. "I'm Plastic" – 0:15
2. "Black and Blue" – 2:44
3. "Fake in Love" – 2:13
4. "Put Me On" – 2:52
5. "Under You" – 3:26
6. "Heart Attack" – 1:23
7. "Regeneration" – 3:28
8. "Diamonds to Ashes" – 2:07
9. "Hanging on the Telephone" (Jack Lee) – 1:51
10. "Crash and Burn" – 4:39
11. "Grounded" – 2:30
12. "Wake Up" – 2:19
13. "The Good Life" – 3:29

== Personnel ==
- Nate Albert – lead vocals, guitar, keyboard, bass
- Mikey Welsh – bass
- Johnny Rioux – guitar, bass
- Joe Sirois – drums
- Dave Aaronoff – keyboard, bass, backing vocals
- Dave Minehan – backing vocals, bass
- Paul Buckley – drums
- Rich Gilbert – pedal steel
- David Mulligan – backing vocals
- Jennifer Malone – backing vocals
