= Loděnice (Beroun District) =

- Municipality
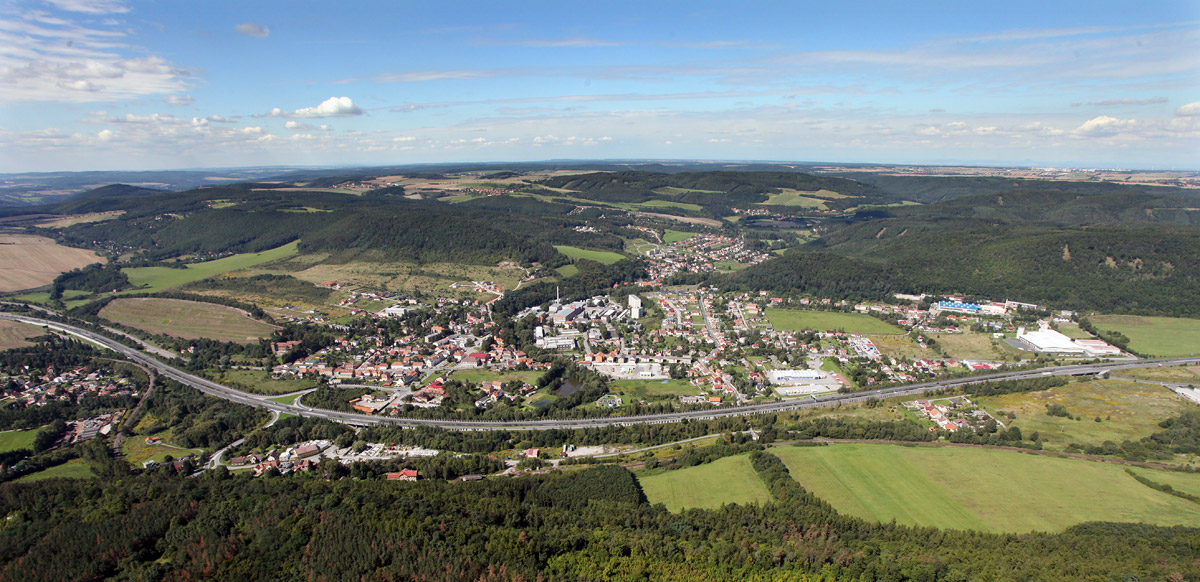
- Aerial view of Loděnice

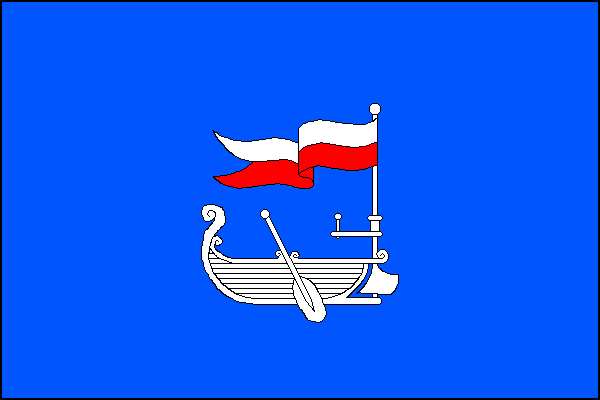
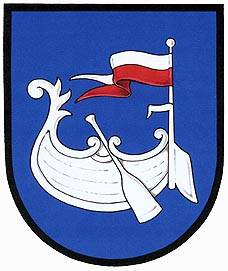
- Flag Coat of arms

- Location in the Czech Republic
- Coordinates: 49°59′42″N 14°9′29″E
- Country: Czech Republic
- Region: Central Bohemian
- District: Beroun
- First mentioned: 1179

Area
  - Total: 6.08 km^{2} (2.35 sq mi)
- Elevation: 255 m (837 ft)

Population (2026-01-01)
  - Total: 2,019
  - Density: 332/km^{2} (860/sq mi)
- Time zone: UTC+1 (CET)
  - Summer (DST): UTC+2 (CEST)
- Postal code: 267 12
- Website: lodenice.cz

Loděnice is a municipality and village in Beroun District in the Central Bohemian Region of the Czech Republic. It has about 2,000 inhabitants. The municipality is home to GZ Media, the world's largest vinyl records manufacturer.

== Administrative division ==
Loděnice consists of two municipal parts (in brackets population according to the 2021 census):

- Loděnice (1,676)
- Jánská (308)

== Etymology ==
The settlement was named after the Loděnice River.

== Geography ==
Loděnice is located about 7 kilometres (4 mi) northeast of Beroun and 17 km (11 mi) southwest of Prague. It lies on the border between the Křivoklát Highlands and Hořovice Uplands. The highest point is a hill at 443 m (1,453 ft) above sea level. The Loděnice River flows through the municipality.

== History ==
The first written mention of Loděnice is from 1179, in the record of a battle for the Bohemian throne between dukes Soběslav II and Frederick, which took place there.

== Demographics ==
Historical population

Year	Pop.	±%
1869	526	—
1880	719	+36.7%
1890	803	+11.7%
1900	1,224	+52.4%
1910	1,456	+19.0%

Year	Pop.	±%
1921	1,472	+1.1%
1930	1,640	+11.4%
1950	1,367	−16.6%
1961	1,637	+19.8%
1970	1,560	−4.7%

Year	Pop.	±%
1980	1,503	−3.7%
1991	1,548	+3.0%
2001	1,520	−1.8%
2011	1,717	+13.0%
2021	1,984	+15.6%

Source: Censuses

== Economy ==
The world's largest vinyl records manufacturer, GZ Media, is located in Loděnice. It employs more than 1,500 people.

== Transport ==
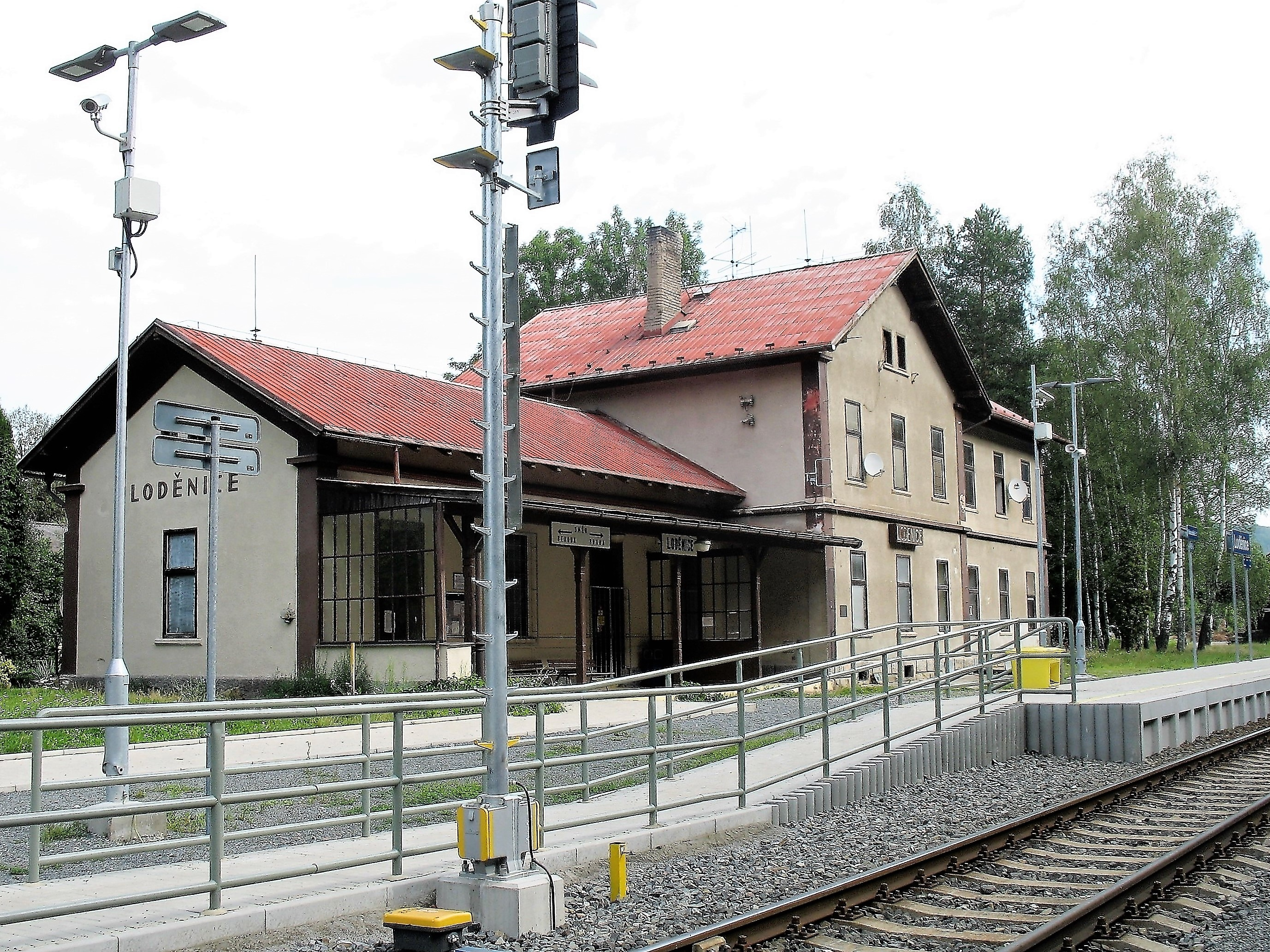
Railway station

The D5 motorway from Prague to Plzeň runs through the municipality.

Loděnice lies on a railway line leading from Prague to Beroun.

== Sights ==
The main landmark of Loděnice is the Church of Saint Wenceslaus. It was built in the Baroque style in 1726. The church tower has a Romanesque core. The rectory next to the church is a late Baroque building from the turn of the 18th and 19th centuries.

== In popular culture ==
The 1966 Oscar-winning film Closely Watched Trains was filmed in and around the local railway station. There is a small museum dedicated to the film and to the Prague–Beroun railway line.
