= GZ Media =

Czech record manufacturing company

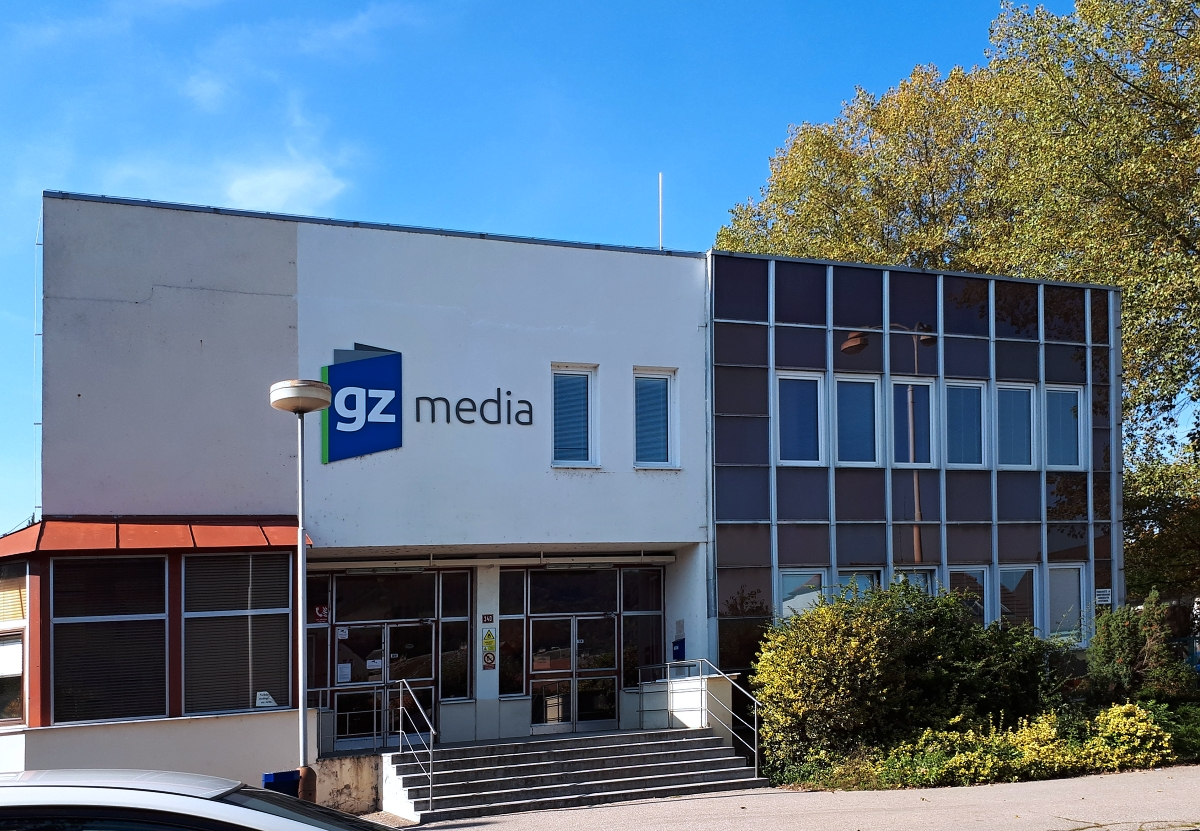
- Founded: 1951
- Headquarters: Czech Republic
- Revenue: 3,836,420,000 Czech koruna (2020)
- Operating income: 451,456,000 Czech koruna (2020)
- Net income: 555,938,000 Czech koruna (2020)
- Total assets: 2,971,099,000 Czech koruna (2020)
- Number of employees: 1,147 (2020)

GZ Media, named for the Czech Gramofonové Závody, which translates to Gramophone Record Factory, employs nearly 2,000 people, and runs its major operations in Loděnice in the Czech Republic. GZ Media is known as the world's largest vinyl manufacturer. Since its founding in 1951, it has supplied records across the Eastern Bloc.

Winslow Partners, a U.S. Private Equity Fund, briefly acquired GZ Media in 1998, only to sell it a few years later. Current GZ Media owner and president Zdenek Pelc is the longest reigning CEO in the history of the Czech Republic.

Supported by American investments, GZ Media has developed into a modern business enterprise, accounting for approximately 60% of total vinyl records produced globally. According to The Guardian, GZ Media was valued at £76 million ($100 million) in 2016 and was forecast to press just over 25 million records a year. In 2015 it produced about 65,000 records per day.

GZ Media is often criticized for inconsistent and poor vinyl pressing quality, with users reporting high rates of defects like warping, non-fill, scratches, and surface noise, though some experience good pressings, suggesting variability linked to high demand, rushed processes, and older equipment, despite GZ's status as a massive, historically significant plant. Complaints highlight issues with quality control (QC), soft vinyl that blisters, and a perception that GZ presses lower-tier pressings as brands avoid mentioning them in marketing for premium releases, contrasting with better QC at smaller plants.

== Vinyl record manufacturing companies affiliated with GZ Media ==
- Precision Record Pressing (Canada)
- Memphis Record Pressing (United States)
- Nashville Record Pressing (United States)
- Pirates Press (United States)
- A to Z Media (United States)
- SNA (France)
