= Jungle of the Midwest Sea =

Studio album by Flatfoot 56
- Released: May 15, 2007
- Genre: Celtic Punk, Oi!
- Length: 39:56
- Label: Flicker
- Producer: Dan Spencer, Ethan Luck

Flatfoot 56 chronology
Knuckles Up (2004)	Jungle of the Midwest Sea (2007)	Black Thorn (2010)

Professional ratings
Review scores
Source	Rating
Jesus Freak Hideout	4/5 stars
Punknews	4.5/5 stars
Cross Rhythms	8/10 stars

Jungle of the Midwest Sea is the fourth studio album by the Chicago celtic punk band Flatfoot 56. The album was released on May 15, 2007 by Flicker Records. The album received critical acclaim and the band embarked on several tours after the release. The album was produced by The O.C. Supertones members, Ethan Luck & Daniel Spencer.

== Track listing ==
All tracks are written by Tobin, Justin, & Kyle Bawinkel, and Josh Robieson.

No.	Title	Length
1.	"The Galley Slave (Intro)"	1:40
2.	"Carry 'Em Out"	2:38
3.	"Loaded Gun"	1:50
4.	"City on a Hill"	3:07
5.	"Bright City"	3:23
6.	"Hoity Toity"	2:26
7.	"Pay Me a Dollar"	3:47
8.	"Chinatown Jail Break"	3:50
9.	"Warriors"	2:11
10.	"Cain"	2:33
11.	"Ollie Ollie"	3:22
12.	"Standing for Nothing"	1:46
13.	"Jungle of the Midwest Sea"	4:12
14.	"Same Ol' Story"	3:11

== Awards ==
The album was nominated for a Dove Award for Rock Album of the Year at the 39th GMA Dove Awards.
