= Back to the World (Street Dogs album) =

Studio album by Street Dogs
- Released: January 25, 2005
- Recorded: 2004
- Genre: Punk rock
- Length: 32:03
- Label: Brass Tacks
- Producer: Nate Albert

Street Dogs chronology
Savin Hill (2003)	Back to the World (2005)	Fading American Dream (2006)

Professional ratings
Review scores
Source	Rating
AllMusic	4/5 stars
Classic Rock	4/5 stars

Back to the World is the second album from punk band Street Dogs. The album was produced by Nate Albert, formerly of The Mighty Mighty Bosstones. "You Alone" and "Back To The World" were both released as singles with music videos.

== Track listing ==
All songs by Nate Albert, Marcus Hollar, Mike McColgan, Johnny Rioux and Joe Sirois unless otherwise noted

1. "Strike a Blow" – 3:01
2. "You Alone" (Hollar, McColgan, Rioux, Sirois) – 2:57
3. "In Defense of Dorchester" – 2:31
4. "Back to the World" (Hollar, McColgan, Rioux, Sirois) – 2:44
5. "Tale of Mass Deception" (Hollar, McColgan, Rioux, Sirois) – 2:56
6. "Drink Tonight" (Hollar, McColgan, Rioux, Sirois) – 1:11
7. "Stagger" – 2:54
8. "White Collar Fraud" – 2:20
9. "Patrick" – 2:57
10. "Pull the Pin" – 2:38
11. "Hands Down" – 3:06
12. "Unions and the Law" (Albert, McColgan, Rioux) – 2:48

== Personnel ==
- Mike McColgan – vocals
- Johnny Rioux – bass
- Marcus Hollar – guitar
- Joe Sirois – drums
