= Johnny Rioux =

American musician

- Born: May 9, 1974 (age 52)
- Origin: New Hampshire, U.S.
- Genres: Punk rock
- Occupations: Musician, record producer, guitar technician, band manager, roadie
- Instruments: Bass guitar, guitar

Johnny Rioux is an American musician primarily known for playing in and working with many punk rock bands. He was initially based in Boston, Massachusetts but is now based in Texas. Rioux is most known for his tenure as bass guitarist with the Street Dogs with whom he joined in 2003.

Rioux has also been in groups such as celtic rock band Murder the Stout (along with former Street Dogs guitarist Marcus Hollar) and Street Dogs' americana side project FM359. He has previously played with Roger Miret and the Disasters, The Bruisers and The Kickovers. He has also worked with bands in non-musician roles including as a guitar technician for The Mighty Mighty Bosstones and tour manager for Dropkick Murphys. He has recently started producing, and has so far produced for Flatfoot 56, the Street Dogs and Roger Miret and the Disasters.

In 2023, Rioux co-founded the band The Defiant which is fronted by former Mighty Mighty Bosstones singer Dicky Barrett and features members of The Offspring, Smash Mouth and The Briggs. The group released their debut album in October 2023.

== Discography ==
=== Performer ===
- Elmer – Biblebanger 7" (1994)
- The Bruisers – Still Standing Up (1997)
- The Bruisers – Molotov (1998)
- The Business – Mob Mentality (2000)
- Roger Miret and the Disasters – Roger Miret and the Disasters (2002)
- The Kickovers– Osaka
- Street Dogs – Savin Hill (2003)
- Street Dogs – Back to the World (2005)
- Street Dogs – Fading American Dream (2006)
- Street Dogs – State of Grace (2008)
- Street Dogs – Street Dogs (2010)
- Roger Miret and the Disasters – Gotta Get Up Now (2011)
- Street Dogs – "Crooked Drunken Sons" 7" (2013)
- Street Dogs – "Rust Belt Nation" 7" (2013)
- Johnny Rioux – Cowboi! (2013)
- FM359 – Truth, Love & Liberty (2014)
- Street Dogs – Street Dogs / Noi!se (2014)
- Street Dogs – Stand For Something Or Die For Nothing (2018)

=== Producer ===
- Street Dogs – Street Dogs (2010)
- Flatfoot 56 – Black Thorn (2010)
- Roger Miret and the Disasters – Gotta Get Up Now (2011)
- Flatfoot 56 – Toil (2012)
- Street Dogs – "Crooked Drunken Sons" 7" (2013)
- Street Dogs – "Rust Belt Nation" 7" (2013)
- Johnny Rioux – Cowboi! (2013)
- FM359 – Truth, Love & Liberty (2014)
- Street Dogs – Stand For Something Or Die For Nothing (2018)

=== Technical ===
- Street Dogs – Street Dogs (2010)
- Flatfoot 56 – Black Thorn (2010)
- Street Dogs – "Crooked Drunken Sons" 7" (2013)
- Street Dogs – "Rust Belt Nation" 7" (2013)
- Bricktop – Murder at 45rpm (2013)
- FM359 – Truth, Love & Liberty (2014)
- Street Dogs – Street Dogs / Noi!se (2014)
