= Stony Brook Independent =

Collegiate news publication

- Type: Collegiate newspaper
- Format: online
- Owner(s): SBI News, Inc.
- Founded: 2005
- Headquarters: Stony Brook, New York
- Website: www.sbindependent.org

The Stony Brook Independent, also colloquially referred to as the "Indie," is a collegiate news publication serving Stony Brook University and the surrounding community.

== History ==
The Independent was founded in January 2005 by Stony Brook University undergraduate students Michael Nevradakis, Jeff Licitra and Karen Mascher, to serve as an alternative hard news publication to the well-established campus paper, The Statesman (Stony Brook). Nevradakis had previously been an editor for The Statesman, before resigning in the fall of 2004, alleging that The Statesman was not following its constitution and other governing documents, a matter which reached the university's Undergraduate Student Government Judiciary. Several other writers also resigned from The Statesman that fall for similar reasons, many of whom also became founding members of the Independent as well.

The name Independent was chosen to signify the new publication's identity as an unbiased, credible, objective source of news pertaining to the Stony Brook University campus, without any display of favoritism towards the university's administration, student government or any specific body of students, while striving to maintain and uphold the highest levels of journalistic ethics. The decision to maintain the Independent as a primarily online publication also reflected the founding editors' goal to provide a source of information that can be updated in real time, which would integrate other audiovisual media such as extensive photo journalism, audio and video, and which would provide a high degree of interactivity with its readers and the campus community.

In its first year of operation, the Independent was published as a subsidiary publication of the Stony Brook University student chapter of the Society of Professional Journalists (SPJ). The Independent also affiliated with Google News, and twice had its articles appear on the front page of Google News in 2005. while still maintaining links with the student chapter of SPJ at Stony Brook. That fall, the Independent also made its first foray into print, through the publication of special "Off the Walls," poster-sized publications resembling a print newspaper's front page, typically with one or two major news headlines, as well as references to the Independent's online presence. Also in fall 2005, the Independent collaborated with the Stony Brook Press, to publish a campus "survival guide" for new students, which appeared online on the Independent's website as well as in print in the Stony Brook Press

== Format ==
The Independent primarily focuses on hard news stories of interest to the Stony Brook University community. Feature articles, investigative reports, sports, arts and entertainment, music reviews, interviews, op-eds, polls, and editors' blogs also make up a large component of the Independent's content on a regular basis. As part of the Independent's effort to provide reputable hard news reporting, the Independent has often sent writers to cover major Stony Brook-related stories off campus, including protests in New York City and Washington D.C. in which Stony Brook students participated, and sporting events, such as Stony Brook's appearance in the 2005 NCAA men's soccer semifinals at New Haven, Connecticut. In some instances, the Independent was the only University media organization to have a reporter on location at these events, such as at the NCAA men's soccer semifinals.

The Independent is an alternative news publication to Stony Brook's oldest campus paper, The Statesman (Stony Brook), while differentiating itself from the more established alternative campus publication, the Stony Brook Press, by focusing more specifically on hard news content, as well as taking advantage of its web-based identity to integrate extensive audiovisual content into its articles, including audio and video clips, photography, artwork and complementary external content from such sources as Youtube.

In addition, the Independent features a dynamic events calendar, publicizing events occurring on the Stony Brook University campus, and has also partnered with campusbin.com, an online textbook exchange founded by Stony Brook University students.

Though the Independent is primarily a web-based news publication, through its "Off the Walls," which are published approximately every 2–4 weeks throughout the academic year, the Independent also maintains a constant print presence throughout the university. The "Off the Walls" are typically posted, with University approval, in various high-traffic locations throughout the university, including the Student Activity Center, the Stony Brook Union, the Melville Library and the Javits Lecture Center.

The Independent also works collaboratively with other recognized student media organizations on campus, including the campus chapter of SPJ, the Stony Brook Press and WUSB 90.1 FM, the university's FCC-licensed non-commercial radio station, where some of the Independent's editors and staffers currently host a live, weekly talk show, "In Focus" (https://web.archive.org/web/20080515155340/http://www.infocusradio.org/). The Independent makes its articles and photography available to other campus media organizations, with proper attribution. The Independent also maintains close ties with the university's fledgling School of Journalism, and many journalism students have had their articles published by the Independent, as part of the overall requirements for their course and major. Closely related to its work with the School of Journalism, the Independent's editorial board often sponsors tutorials and seminars for any interested student to learn the finer points of such topics as news writing and photography.

Finally, the Independent also is an active participant in many campus-wide student media initiatives, including the Student Media Council (SMC) and the Martin Buskin Journalism Committee. As a part of the SMC, the Independent's editors have been invited to interview University President Shirley Strum Kenny on a regular basis, and have access to all University press and media events, press releases and other content made available to media entities.

== Structure ==
The Independent is run entirely by students, both undergraduate and graduate, but has also featured content submissions from the campus and surrounding community, and world at large. The Independent holds weekly meetings during the academic year, open to all students, and is also an active participant in the university's Student Media Council, an advisory group encompassing all of the university's recognized student media organizations.

Though the Independent was first launched as a subsidiary publication of the Stony Brook University campus chapter of SPJ, the Independent, as of fall 2005, is officially registered as a stand-alone student publication by the university's Undergraduate Student Government (USG), as well as by the university's Graduate Student Organization (GSO), and is advised by a member of the university's staff. The Independent maintains close ties with the campus chapter of SPJ, as well as SPJ's regional chapter for Long Island, the Press Club of Long Island. Similarly to its counterpart, the Stony Brook Statesman, the Independent is managed through a not-for-profit corporation, known as SBI News, Inc., registered in Suffolk County, New York. The Independent maintains an office in the "media wing" of the Stony Brook Union, where most other campus media organizations are also headquartered.

The Independent does not receive funding from the USG or the GSO. This reflects the Independent's standing editorial policy of maintaining a greater degree of independence from the student government than other on-campus media organizations which do receive student government funds. The relative lack of overhead of a web-based publication compared to a print publication has also reduced the necessity of applying for funding from any student government body. The Independent is funded from limited advertising on its website and "Off the Walls," as well as grants and the out-of-pocket donations of its editors, staffers and alumni.

The Independent maintains a current staff size of approximately 25 writers and editors, all of whom possess official Stony Brook University media credentials and have access to all events taking place on campus as a result.

== Recognition ==
Largely as a result of the successful launch of the Independent in 2005, Region 1 of the Society of Professional Journalists (encompassing most of the Northeastern United States) named the Stony Brook University student chapter, which oversaw the launch, as "chapter of the year" for 2005.

Several Independent editors and staffers have also been recognized by the university's Martin Buskin Committee for Outstanding Campus Journalism, an organization of Stony Brook University faculty and staff, as well as Stony Brook University alums who are employed in the field of professional journalism and who, in their student days, were actively involved in campus journalism. The awards are issued annually and are sponsored by Newsday. In 2006, the Independent's Executive Editor, George Agathos, won the Martin Buskin Cub Award for Outstanding Campus Journalism; an award which is given to that year's outstanding student journalist who is a freshman or sophomore at the university. Also that year, Independent writer Radeyah Hack won the Martin Buskin Award for Outstanding Campus Journalism (awarded to a junior or senior). In 2005, Michael Nevradakis, one of the founding members of the Independent and its inaugural Editor-in-Chief, won the Martin Buskin Award for Outstanding Campus Journalism, as a result of his work in helping launch the Independent.
