= The Newcastle Argus and District Advertiser =

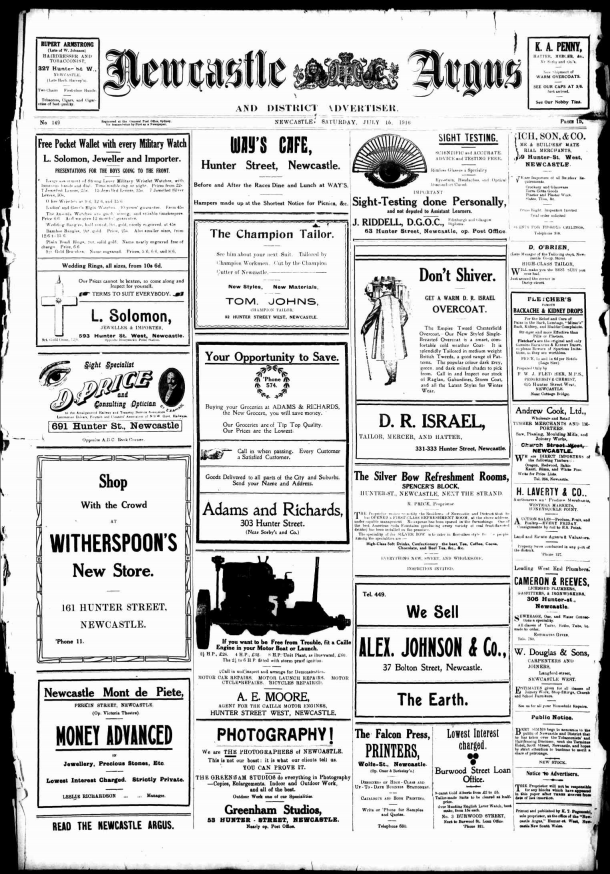
The front page of the Newcastle Argus and District Advertiser on 15 July 1916.

The Newcastle Argus and District Advertiser was an English language newspaper published in Newcastle, New South Wales, Australia in the early 20th century. It later became The Toiler and then The Industrialist.

== History ==
The paper began in the early 20th century and was printed and published by K. T. Pogonoski. It consisted chiefly of advertisements for businesses in the Newcastle area in New South Wales. It changed its name to The Toiler in 1920 and was published by Harry Spencer Wood until 1921 when it became The Industrialist : the official organ of Newcastle Industrial Council from 1921 until 1922.

== Digitisation ==
The various versions of the paper have been digitised as part of the Australian Newspapers Digitisation Program project hosted by the National Library of Australia.

== See also ==
- List of newspapers in New South Wales
- List of newspapers in Australia
