= Paul Rucker =

Paul Rucker is an American multimedia artist, composer, and musician. He is known for his musical compositions and live performance with visual art to which address the legacy of enslavement and the prison industrial complex in the United States.
