= Pirates Press Records =

- Founded: 2005
- Founder: Eric Mueller
- Genre: Punk Rock, Oi!, Street Punk, Hardcore, Ska, Reggae
- Country of origin: United States
- Location: Emeryville, California
- Official website: Official website of Pirates Press Records

Pirates Press Records is a punk rock record label founded in 2005. The label is based in the San Francisco Bay Area, with its headquarters located in Emeryville, California. The label releases music representing a variety of punk rock subgenres, including Oi!, street punk, hardcore, ska-punk, and pop-punk, as well as related genres such as ska, reggae, and indie rock. Some of the best-known artists who have released music with the label include Rancid (as well as several members' individual side projects and other bands), Cock Sparrer, Subhumans, The Aggrolites, The Slackers, The Bar Stool Preachers, and more. Bands affiliated with the label regularly feature on lineups at major festivals such as BYO Punk Rock Bowling & Music Festival in Las Vegas, NV, USA; Rebellion Festival in Blackpool, UK; and Riot Fest in Chicago, IL, USA. The label has also released several notable compilations, including the Oi! This is Streepunk! series, label sampler One Family One Flag (and its follow up For Family and Flag), and Oi! 40 Years Untamed, a 40th anniversary follow-up to Garry Bushell's Oi! compilation series. The label also released Under One Flag, a year-long, weekly 7" record subscription.

The label is a sister company of Pirates Press, a manufacturing & production company that is responsible for pressing all of the label's releases, in addition to releases from many outside customers. Due to the close relationship with the pressing company, the label is known for featuring unique pressings featuring a variety of color configurations and packaging options. The label's first release was a box set of 7-inch picture discs, and subsequent releases have included features such as hologram vinyl, glow-in-the-dark vinyl, UV digitally printed vinyl, custom shapes or text milled out of the vinyl, and a flexi disc released in a custom-labeled glass bottle designed to resemble a Molotov cocktail.

== History ==
Eric Mueller started Pirates Press Records in 2005. Mueller saw the label as an opportunity to have a direct hand in releasing music he and his employees were excited about, as well as to make special vinyl releases that showed off the capabilities of Pirates Press as a manufacturer.

=== Essentials Box Set Series ===
In 2010, after having worked with the band on the a handful of singles and the US release of their LP Here We Stand, Pirates Press Records released a Cock Sparrer box set which included many of the band's releases. Entitled Cock Sparrer Essentials, the package includes 6 studio albums, 4 full live albums, singles, picture discs and more. It also included sides of remixed, remastered, or otherwise previously unreleased 180gram heavyweight colored vinyl, a book, two posters, a limited edition metal lapel pin, screenprint and more. In addition, the label released a live LP/DVD, Back In SF, recorded in 2009 at the Pirates Press fifth anniversary party at Great American Music Hall. The label also released a second box set called Cock Sparrer Live Essentials, which exclusively featured live recordings.

In 2012, Rancid's first release with the label was a new song called "Fuck You" on the 2012 compilation Oi! This Is Streetpunk Vol. 2. That same year, the label released the second artist's Essentials box set, Rancid Essentials, a 20-year anniversary box set which contains all of the band's releases to date on 46 7" vinyl records housed in a faux-leather box. A deluxe mailorder version was sold including a limited edition Rancid-branded baseball bat made by Louisville Slugger. Sets of 7"s representing each individual album were also released. The label has continued working with Rancid as well as numerous projects by individual members.

In 2015, the third artist's Essentials box set was released, featuring San Francisco's Reducers SF.

In 2018, the fourth artist's Essentials box set was released, featuring New Jersey's The Ratchets. The Ratchets had been one of the bands included in the 7" box set that was the label's first release, and their debut LP Glory Bound had been the label's first LP release.

In 2019, Pirates Press Records issued the new album Reggae Now! by The Aggrolites, as well as reissuing the band's debut LP, Dirty Reggae. The following year, The Aggrolites Essentials became the fifth artist's Essentials box set, including all of the band's studio LPs recorded to date in a window-box slipcase. In addition to the box set, each album was also newly pressed for individual sale, some appearing on vinyl for the first time.

=== Rock the Ship Festivals ===
On October 25, 2014, to celebrate the 10th anniversary of Pirates Press and Pirates Press Records, the label hosted a day-long show outside of Thee Parkside in San Francisco, headlined by Cock Sparrer and The Bouncing Souls, as well as a pre-party show at Thee Parkside the previous night and an after-party the same evening at the Bottom of the Hill, under the banner "Rock the Ship."

From October 17–20, 2019, to celebrate the 15th anniversary of both Pirates Press and Pirates Press Records, the label hosted a weekend-long Rock the Ship Festival featuring a large lineup of label artists and friends playing at venues in both Oakland & San Francisco. The festival's main event was an all-day show onboard the flight deck of the USS Hornet, a retired World War II-era US Navy aircraft carrier docked in Alameda, headlined by Cock Sparrer and Subhumans. The festival also raised money for music and art programs in Bay Area public schools via auction items donated by the label, artists, and other local businesses.

== Pirates Press Records artists ==
- 45 Adapters
- The Aggrolites
- Antagonizers ATL
- The Bar Stool Preachers
- Billy Liar
- Bishops Green
- Blind Pigs
- Bombshell Rocks
- Charger (featuring Matt Freeman of Rancid)
- CJ Ramone
- Cock Sparrer
- Come Closer
- The Complicators
- DeeCRACKS
- Downtown Struts
- The Drowns
- Harrington Saints
- Landfill Crew (featuring Tim Armstrong of Rancid)
- Lars Frederiksen (solo project of the Rancid member)
- Lars Frederiksen and the Bastards (side project of the Rancid member)
- Lenny Lashley's Gang of One
- Lion's Law
- Monster Squad
- The New Darkbuster
- NOi!SE
- Off With Their Heads
- The Old Firm Casuals (featuring Lars Frederiksen of Rancid)
- Plizzken
- Rancid
- The Ratchets
- The Re-Volts
- Reducers SF
- The Restarts
- Roadside Bombs
- Seized Up
- Shuffle and Bang (featuring Korey Kingston of The Aggrolites, Hepcat)
- Teenage Bottlerocket
- The Slackers
- Street Dogs
- Subhumans
- Suedehead (featuring Davey Warsop of Beat Union, Sharp Shock)
- Suzi Moon (solo project by the member of Civet)
- The Templars
- Territories
- Tim Timebomb and Friends (side project of the Rancid member)
- The Vicious Cycles

== See also ==
- Pirates Press
- List of record labels
