= Street Dogs =

American punk rock band

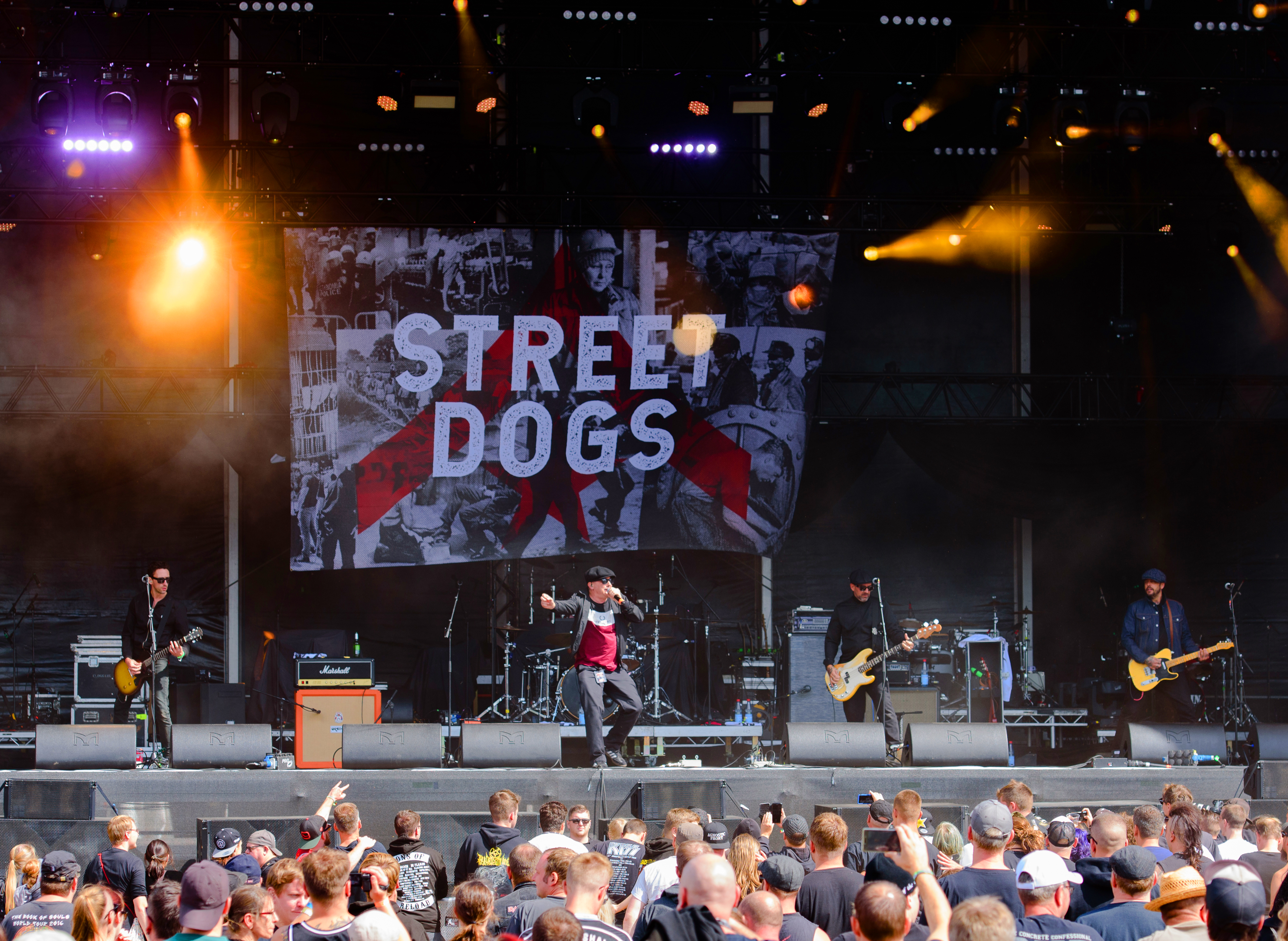
- Street Dogs performing live 2018

Background information
- Origin: Boston, Massachusetts, U.S.
- Genres: Street punk; punk rock; Oi!
- Years active: 2002–2020, 2024–present
- Labels: Pirates Press; Hellcat; Brass Tacks; Crosscheck
- Members: Mike McColgan; Johnny Rioux; Tobe Bean III; Paul Rucker; Rhys Kill
- Past members: Jeff Erna; Rob Guidotti; Bill Close; Michelle Paulhus; Marcus Hollar; Joe Sirois; Pete Sosa; Lenny Lashley; Matt Pruitt
- Website: street-dogs.com

Street Dogs is an American punk rock band from Boston, Massachusetts, formed in 2002 by former Dropkick Murphys singer Mike McColgan. The band disbanded in early 2020 after 17 years together but reunited again in 2024.

== History ==
In 1997, McColgan left Dropkick Murphys "to pursue a lifelong dream of becoming a firefighter for the Boston Fire Department." In 2002, McColgan decided he could no longer stay away from music and formed Street Dogs. They first recorded a seven-song demo, which featured McColgan along with his former Dropkick Murphys bandmate Jeff Erna on drums, Rob Guidotti on guitar, and Bill Close on bass. They signed with CrossCheck Records in 2003, with Michelle Paulhus now on bass. By the time they started recording their first album, they yet again had someone else on bass, this time Johnny Rioux. Savin Hill (which was produced by former Mighty Mighty Bosstones member Nate Albert and featured guest appearances by Al Barr and Ken Casey from Dropkick Murphys) was a success and resulted in a supporting tour with Celtic punk band Flogging Molly.

The band underwent a complete shuffle in 2004 when McColgan took a leave of absence from his firefighting career to devote time to recording and promoting their second album Back to the World. The Street Dogs at this time enlisted Marcus Hollar on lead guitar, and expanded the range of their sound with the addition of rhythm guitarist Tobe Bean III. The drummer's spot was filled by Joe Sirois, formerly of the Mighty Mighty Bosstones.

Their second release, Back to the World, proved to be even more of a success for the band. It was hailed critically in the United States, Europe and Japan and opened the doors to touring with Social Distortion, Tiger Army, Bad Religion, Millencolin (in Europe), the Bouncing Souls (US and Japan) and the Briefs. The band also toured on the Vans Warped Tour in the summer of 2005 and embarked on their first headlining tours in the US and Europe.

2006 saw more shows, both headlining and opening for the likes of Rancid, the Adolescents and the Bouncing Souls. Also in 2006, they released their third album, Fading American Dream. It was recorded earlier in the year with producer Ted Hutt (Flogging Molly, Madcap, the Bouncing Souls).

While on tour opening for Flogging Molly on February 27, 2007, at the Sokol Auditorium in Omaha, NE, bass player Johnny Rioux collapsed on stage due to an apparent seizure. McColgan stopped the show and called for paramedics. At the start of the Flogging Molly set, lead singer Dave King dedicated the show to Johnny and announced that he was all right and would be well enough to play the next night in St. Louis. Following that tour, more dates came headlining as well as European shows.

In February 2008, it was announced that the Street Dogs signed on to Hellcat Records. Their fourth album, State of Grace, for Hellcat, which they started recording in early February 2008, once again with Ted Hutt was released on July 8, 2008.

At recent shows, Street Dogs have been promoting Oxfam America, a humanitarian organization fighting poverty and hunger. McColgan spoke to the crowd mid-set at the Bamboozle Festival in New Jersey in May 2008 about the organization while wearing an Oxfam T-shirt. In support of State of Grace, the band toured at the Vans Warped Tour 2008 as a main stage act. Following their Warped tour stint, the group set out on their successful fall State Of Grace headlining tour and then went to Europe for the European Eastpak Antidote tour.

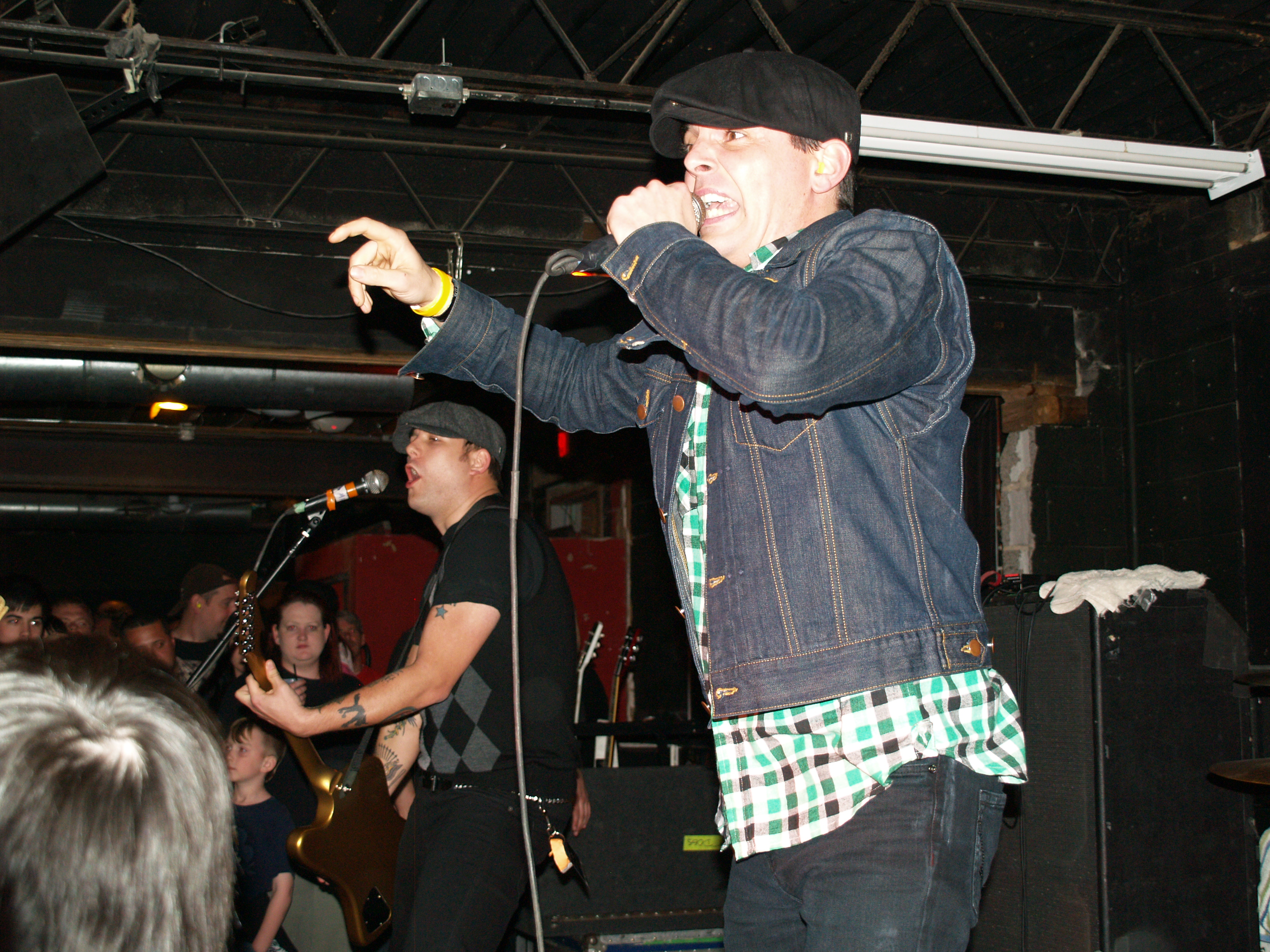
Street Dogs performing in 2009

The band released their fifth album, Street Dogs, on August 31, 2010 on Hellcat Records.

On February 21, 2011, the band performed at an acoustic show with Tom Morello, Tim McIlrath, Wayne Kramer, and Ike Reilly in Madison, Wisconsin, in support of the ongoing protests against Gov. Scott Walker's proposed Budget Repair Bill.

In March 2011, the Street Dogs announced a five-week stint on the 2011 Vans Warped Tour, from June 24 until July 30. This would be their third time on the tour, after 2005 and 2008. After the Warped Tour, the band planned a European festival tour in August, and then Australia and Japan in October.

The band embarked on the nine date Sham Rock-N-Roll Festival in September 2011 where they were the co-headlining act for the Dropkick Murphys. Other than appearances on various Warped Tour lineups, this was the first time McColgan toured with his former band since quitting thirteen years earlier. McColgan would even join the Dropkick Murphys onstage for performances of such songs as "Barroom Hero" and "Far Away Coast" from the Do or Die album.

In an interview with AMP, Johnny Rioux was asked about a new album from the Street Dogs. Rioux said, "We want to do a labor standard solo record with Mike, release the large number of B-sides with the records they were recorded for, mix our live in Boston DVD and record, prepare for our first trip to Australia, return to Japan, get back into some Celtic festivals, and just be happy and grateful people are still loyal after almost 10 years."

On November 26, 2012, McColgan wrote on the band's Facebook account that starting January 1, 2013, Street Dogs would be taking a break from recording and touring, but he assured fans that the band was not breaking up. Later that day, Tobe Bean announced that he would no longer be a touring member of Street Dogs, but he will "always be a Street Dog". In February 2013, it was announced that McColgan and Rioux would form a side project with original Dropkick Murphys member Rick Barton called FM359. In March, it was announced their break from touring would be ending in July when they tour Europe. In March, McColgan mentioned that the band would exclusively work with the Pirates Press Records label in the future, and they planned to release a 7-inch single, a live album, and a DVD. He also mentioned that the band was hoping to get Lenny Lashley from Darkbuster to replace Bean on guitar, and on April 9 the Street Dogs Facebook page announced that Lashley had officially joined the group. They also announced their next single, "Crooked Drunken Sons", a song named after their annual tour, which will be released on Record Store Day 2013. Another single, "Rustbelt Nation", followed a month later. Later in the year, Hollar was replaced by Matt Pruitt (Have Nots).

Members Mike McColgan, Johnny Rioux and Pete Sosa started a side project called FM359 with former Dropkick Murphys guitarist Rick Barton, Street Dogs collaborator Hugh Morrison and Halston Luna. The group, which has an Americana sound, released their debut album Truth, Love and Liberty in January 2014. In April, on Record Store Day 2014, they released a split EP with Noi!se.

On June 22, 2018, the band released their sixth album, the first in eight years, Stand for Something or Die for Nothing. McColgan said of the album, " "The dumbing down of America is a reason to write songs in 2018. The theme is wake the fuck up and the working class needs to unite across all colors, creeds, nationalities, genders and realize that we are being pitted against each other by snake oil salesmen and autocrats."

On February 13, 2020, via the band's Facebook page, McColgan and Rioux announced the group was disbanding after 17 years. The final round of shows was expected to include a small St. Patrick's Day tour with Flogging Molly and Mad Caddies as well as two headlining shows, one in Long Beach, California, on March 16, and their final show to be announced in their hometown of Boston. However on March 12, the band announced the cancellation of the Long Beach show alongside Flogging Molly's cancellation of their tour due to the COVID-19 pandemic.

A shock to many, on July 13, 2024, via the band's Instagram page, Street Dogs hinted towards something being announced the following week. On July 17, 2024, the band would be announced as the replacement for Sick of It All for the Saturday date of NOFX's final Massachusetts appearances. Additionally, Street Dogs played a club show on August 8, 2024 at The Middle East in Cambridge, Massachusetts as a way to warm up the weekend towards the festival show. This marked the first time the band has played together since 2020. On March 28, 2025, the band announced the Street Dogs Forever European tour from June to July 2025.

== Band members ==
=== Current members ===
- Mike McColgan – lead vocals (2002–2020, 2024–present)
- Johnny Rioux – bass (2003–2020, 2024–present)
- Tobe Bean III – guitars (2005–2012, 2024–present)
- Paul Rucker – drums (2007–2012, 2024–present)
- Rhys Kill – lead guitar (2024–present)

=== Former members ===
- Jeff Erna – drums (2002–2004)
- Rob Guidotti – guitars (2002–2004)
- Bill Close – bass (2002)
- Michelle Paulhus – bass (2002–2003)
- Marcus Hollar – lead guitar (2004–2013)
- Joe Sirois – drums (2004–2007)
- Pete Sosa – drums (2012–2020)
- Lenny Lashley – rhythm guitar (2013–2020)
- Matt Pruitt – lead guitar (2013–2020)

== Discography ==
=== Albums ===
- Savin Hill (2003)
- Back to the World (2005)
- Fading American Dream (2006)
- State of Grace (2008)
- Street Dogs (2010)
- Stand for Something or Die for Nothing (2018)

=== EPs ===
- Demo (2002)
- Round One (split EP with The Dents) (2004)
- "Tale of Mass Deception" (2004)
- "Crooked Drunken Sons" (2013)
- "Rustbelt Nation" (2013)
- Street Dogs / Noi!se (split EP with Noi!se) (2014)

=== Singles ===
- "War After the War" (2009)
- "GOP" (2012)

=== Music videos ===
- "Savin Hill" (2003)
- "You Alone" (2005)
- "Back to the World" (2005)
- "Final Transmission" (2006)
- "Two Angry Kids" (2009)
- "Rattle and Roll" (2010)
- "Punk Rock & Roll" (2011)
- "GOP" (2012)

=== Compilation appearances ===
- Fat City Presents: Bands We Like, Vol. 1 (2003)
  - Includes the demo version of "Cut Down on the 12th" from Savin Hill
- Old Skars and Upstarts 2004 (2004)
  - Includes "Lock and Loaded", previously a vinyl-only bonus track on Savin Hill
- Fat City Presents: Bands We Like, Vol. 2 (2005)
  - Includes an alternate version of "Unions and the Law" from Back to the World
- Old Skars and Upstarts 2005 (2005)
  - Includes "Drink Tonight"
- "Atticus: Dragging the Lake Volume III" (2005)
  - Includes "In Defense of Dorchester"
- Backyard City Rockers 4 (2007)
  - Includes "Decency Police"
- Warped Tour 2005 Tour Compilation (2005)
  - Includes "You Alone"
- Warped Tour 2007 Tour Compilation (2007)
  - Includes "Fading American Dream"
- Warped Tour 2008 Tour Compilation (2008)
  - Includes "Mean Fist"
- New Noise (2010)
  - Includes "Rattle and Roll"
