= AMP (magazine) =

Defunct American music magazine

- The cover art of issue #12, featuring Green Day.
- Editor-in-Chief: Lisa Root
- Editor: Brett Matthews
- Design Editor: John Joh
- Categories: Music
- Frequency: Monthly
- Circulation: 80,000
- Publisher: American Music Press Magazine
- Founder: Brett Matthews; Lisa Root; John Joh
- Founded: 2002
- First issue: September 2002; 24 years ago
- Final issue Number: November 2012; 13 years ago 112
- Country: United States
- Based in: Martinez, California
- Language: English
- Website: ampmagazine.net
- OCLC: 64709668

AMP Magazine (short for American Music Press Magazine) was an American music magazine founded in 2002, by Brett Matthews, Lisa Root and John Joh. It featured interviews, album and live reviews and band journals. Online, it featured exclusive videos and audio, as well as video game reviews. It closed its doors on February 26, 2013, with its 112th issue having been published in November 2012. Root went on to form New Noise Magazine.

== History ==
AMP was published monthly by American Music Press, with a print run of 80,000 copies. It focused primarily on punk, hardcore and metal music. Some of the prominent editors were Lucas Andrews, John Joh, Johnathan Marshall, Lisa Root, Jake Round, Tony Shrum, Sean Stepp, Chris Taravella and Nick White.

Matthews' beginning in music journalism started in 1996, with a fanzine he wrote titled Hit List. It lasted three years. AMP Magazine came together in 2002, when he partnered with Lisa Root and John Joh. The trio eventually formed the sister publications Loud Fast Rules! Magazine (covering old school punk music) in 2005, and Hails & Horns Magazine (covering heavy metal music) in 2007.

AMP broadened focus from the underground music scene, which allowed for coverage of bands not featured in its contemporaries Maximumrocknroll and Alternative Press. He notes in an interview with Metro Post-Telegraph, that eventually "AMP started getting out of its sector and started getting too big."

In 2012, NOFX lead vocalist and bassist Fat Mike funded the magazine.

AMP ceased publication in 2013. An official notice from Matthews read, "we thank you for your more than a decade of support, and undying love and celebration of that which is our underground. It has been an amazing ride, and we can't wait to see what awesome magazines arise to tell the story of the shape of punk to come."

== AMP Magazine Presents ==
Between 2002 and 2011, AMP released over two dozen CD samplers, as well as five genre compilations titled AMP Magazine Presents, including material from Atreyu, Every Time I Die, Madball, New Crash Position and Sick of it All.

A review by AllMusic for the first compilation, Hardcore, Vol. 1, says "it's a solid mix of tracks all the way through, perfect as a mix tape for scene veterans, but even better as an introduction for newbies," adding that "for them, it probably should have come with earplugs." Two DVD video albums were also released.

Albums

- Hardcore, Vol. 1 (2004)
- Street Punk, Vol. 2 (2004)
- Metal, Vol. 3 (2004)
- Pop Punk, Vol. 4 (2005)
- Psychobilly, Vol. 5 (2006)

Video albums

- Video Archive for the Ages, Vol. 1 (2005)
- Video Archive for the Ages, Vol. 2 (2005)
