= Brian Fallon discography =

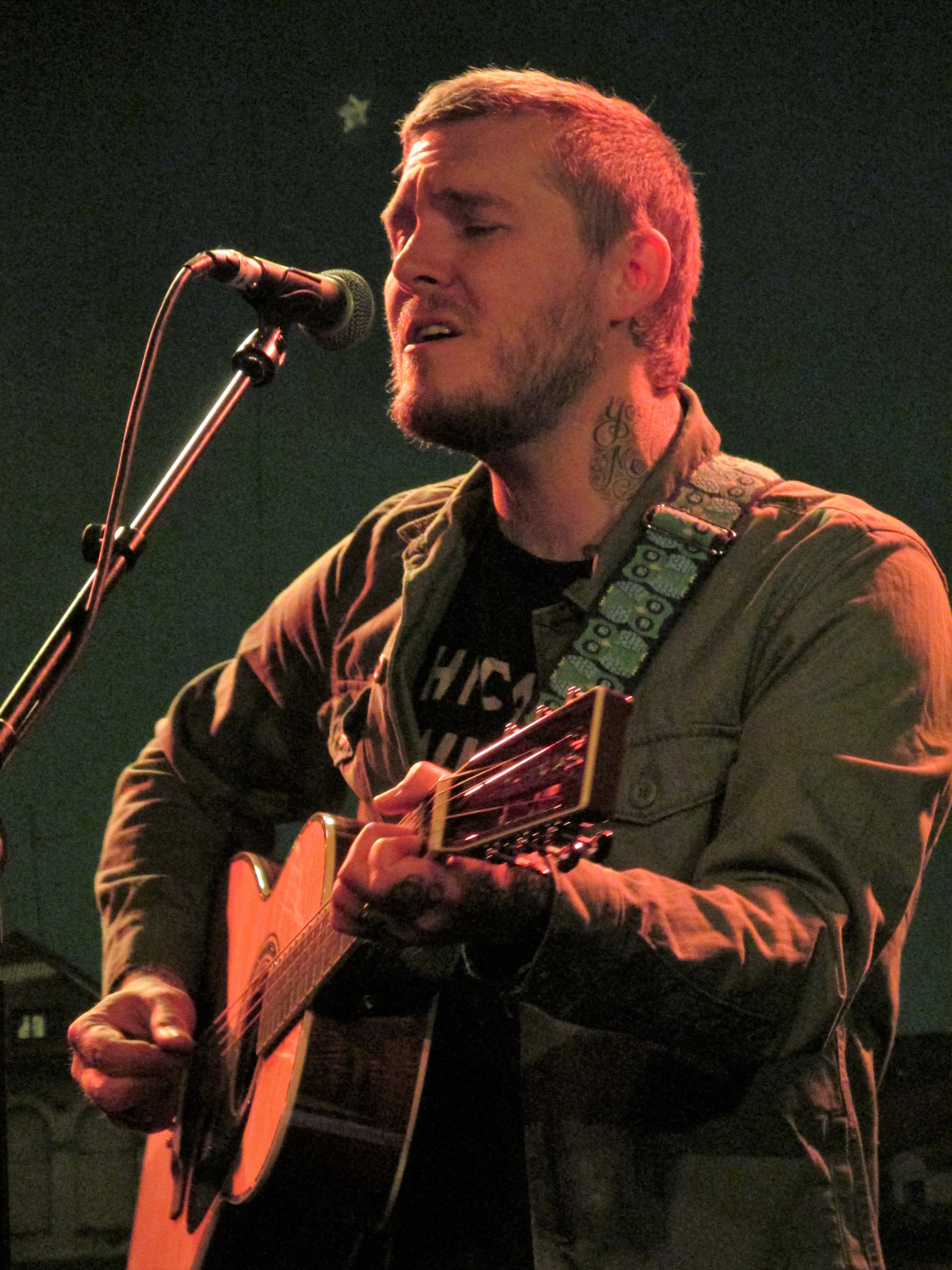
- Fallon performing in 2019
- Studio albums: 5
- EPs: 1
- Singles: 15
- Music videos: 10

The discography of Brian Fallon, an American singer-songwriter and musician best known for his work with The Gaslight Anthem. His debut solo studio album, Painkillers, was released in March 2016. Ir peaked at number 30 on the Billboard 200. The album includes the single "A Wonderful Life". His second studio album, Sleepwalkers, was released in February 2018. It peaked at number 42 on the Billboard 200. The album includes the singles "Forget Me Not", "If Your Prayers Don't Get to Heaven", "See You on the Other Side" and "My Name Is the Night (Color Me Black)". His third studio album, Local Honey, was released in March 2020. It includes the singles "You Have Stolen My Heart", "21 Days" and "When You're Ready". Fallon released his fourth studio album, Night Divine, in November 2021. It is composed of popular hymns performed by Fallon. On September 10, 2026, Fallon will release his fifth studio album, titled Not Bad for New Jersey.

== Studio albums ==
Title	Details	Peak chart positions								
Title	Details	US	AUS	AUT	CAN	GER	IRE	NL	SWI	UK
Painkillers	Released: March 11, 2016; Label: Island Records; Formats: Digital download, CD, streaming	30	36	20	27	12	35	44	57	13
Sleepwalkers	Released: February 9, 2018; Label: Island Records; Formats: Digital download, CD, streaming	42	—	15	55	6	49	130	32	15
Local Honey	Released: March 27, 2020; Label: Lesser Known Records; Formats: Digital download, CD, streaming	150	—	48	—	16	—	—	67	32
Night Divine	Released: November 5, 2021; Label: Lesser Known Records; Formats: Digital download, CD, streaming	—	—	—	—	—	—	—	—	—
Not Bad for New Jersey	Released: September 10, 2026; Label: Lesser Known Records; Formats: Digital download, CD, streaming	— (Note: Not Bad for New Jersey did not enter the Billboard 200, but peaked at number 20 on the Top Album Sales chart.)	—	—	—	—	—	—	—	—
"—" denotes a recording that did not chart or was not released in that territory.

== Extended plays ==
Title	Details
Georgia	Released: April 16, 2016; Label: Island Records; Formats: Digital download

== Singles ==
Title	Year	Peak chart positions	Album
Title	Year	US Rock Digi.	Album
"A Wonderful Life"	2015	—	Painkillers
"Forget Me Not"	2017	20	Sleepwalkers
"If Your Prayers Don't Get to Heaven"	2017	—	Sleepwalkers
"See You on the Other Side"	2018	—	Sleepwalkers
"My Name Is the Night (Color Me Black)"	2018	—	Sleepwalkers
"Silence"	2018	—	Non-album single
"You Have Stolen My Heart"	2019	—	Local Honey
"21 Days"	2020	—	Local Honey
"When You're Ready"	2020	—	Local Honey
"E-Bow the Letter" (Amazon Original) (with Nicole Atkins)	2021	—	Non-album single
"Virgin Mary Had One Son"	2021	—	Night Divine
"Amazing Grace"	2021	—	Night Divine
"Not Bad for New Jersey"	2026	—	Not Bad for New Jersey
"Better Before"	2026		Not Bad for New Jersey
"Pearls"	2026	—	Not Bad for New Jersey
"—" denotes a recording that did not chart or was not released in that territory.

== Other appearances ==
Title	Year	Album	Band	Record label	Credits
"Alarm"	2000	Non-album songs	Lanemeyer	Springman Records	Vocal
"Somebody to Shove" (Soul Asylum cover)	2000	Non-album songs	Lanemeyer	Springman Records	Vocal
"No Surrender"	2009	London Calling: Live in Hyde Park	Bruce Springsteen & the E Street Band	Columbia Records	Vocal
"The South Has Spoiled Me"	2010	Raise It High	Chamberlain	—	Vocal
"Meet You in the Middle"	2011	Covering Ground	Chuck Ragan	SideOneDummy Records	Vocal
"The Ghost of Tom Joad" (Bruce Springsteen cover)	2013	Long Forgotten Songs: B-Sides & Covers (2000-2013)	Rise Against with Tom Morello & Wayne Kramer	Interscope Records	Vocal, Guitar
"Old Light"	2014	From Parts Unknown	Every Time I Die	Epitaph Records	Vocals
Long Ride Home	2020	Party	David Hause and Brian Fallon	Soundly Music	Co-lead vocals
"Yes It's True" (The Slackers cover)	2023	Non-album songs	Catbite and Brian Fallon	Bad Time Records	Co-lead vocals, guitar
"Don't Fear the Reaper" (Blue Oyster Cult cover)	2024	Non-album songs	Phlotilla and Brian Fallon	1488375 Records	Vocals
"Will You Still Love Me Tomorrow" (The Shirelles cover)	2026	Ready or Not 2: Here I Come	Brian Fallon with Madi Diaz	Hollywood	Co-lead vocals

== Music videos ==
Title	Year	Ref.
"A Wonderful Life"	2016	
"Nobody Wins"	2016	
"Painkillers"	2016	
"Steve McQueen"	2016	
"Forget Me Not"	2017	
"You Have Stolen My Heart"	2019	
"21 Days"	2020	
"When You're Ready"	2020	
"Virgin Mary Had One Son" (official performance video)	2021	
"Amazing Grace" (official performance video)	2021	
