= Merovingian Music =

- Parent company: Universal Music Group
- Founded: 2006
- Founder: Jack Ponti; Gregory Edgerton; Kyle Kraszewski
- Distributor: Capitol Music Group
- Genre: Metal, rock, alternative, R&B
- Country of origin: U.S.
- Location: Red Bank, New Jersey

Merovingian Music also abbreviated as MRV or MRV Music, was a non-genre specific record label in Red Bank, New Jersey. The label was founded by Jack Ponti who is also CEO of the company. Shortly after, independent label owners Gregory Edgerton and Kyle Kraszewski were appointed co-presidents.

MRV entered a partnership with Jive/Battery to release the MC and Drummer duo Big Heed and Alien. In early 2010 Capitol Records, C.E. Music (David Letterman's Worldwide Pants Inc.) and MRV joined forces to release the pop-rock band Runner Runner, which includes former members of Rufio, Over It, and Don't Look Down. Merovingian signed Belgian rock band Black Box Revelation and released music by Sebastian Bach and Anthony Hamilton via a distribution deal with EMI.

== Current roster ==
- The Black Box Revelation
- Runner Runner
- Big Heed and Alien
- Sebastian Bach
- The Sunstreak
- Royal Bliss

== Past ==
- Anthony Hamilton
- Kittie
- Bertell
- Lady Fantastic
- Supagroup
- Plastic Parachute
- The Trews
- Wire Daisies

* denotes international acts licensed to Merovingian Music in the U.S.

== Discography ==
- Kittie - "Funeral for Yesterday" single (2006)
- Kittie - Funeral for Yesterday album w/ bonus DVD (2007)
- Kittie - "Breathe" single (2007)
- Anthony Hamilton - "They Don't Know" single (2007)
- Anthony Hamilton - Southern Comfort album (2007)
- Supagroup - "What's Your Problem Now" single (2007)
- Supagroup - Fire for Hire album (2007)
- Sebastian Bach - "(Love Is) A Bitchslap" single (2007)
- Sebastian Bach - Angel Down album (2007)
- Sebastian Bach - "By Your Side" single (2008)
- Plastic Parachute - "Betty Ford Princess" single (2008)
- Wire Daisies - "Make Everything Change" single (2008)
- Royal Bliss - "Save Me" single (2008)
- Royal Bliss - Life In-Between album (2008)
- Sebastian Bach - Angel Down: Limited Edition album w/ bonus DVD ROADRAGE a film by Sebastian Bach (2008)
- Royal Bliss - "We Did Nothing Wrong" single (2009)
- The Trews - "Paranoid Freak" single (2009)
- Wire Daisies - Wire Daisies album (2009)
- The Trews - No Time for Later album (2009)
- The Sunstreak - "Until I Met You" single (2009)
- The Sunstreak - Once upon a Lie album (2009)
- Royal Bliss - "I Just Want You (For Christmas)" single (2009)
- Bertell - "She Bad" feat. Bun B single (2009)
- Bertell - "Beat It Up" single (2010)
- Bertell - "Beat It Up" feat. Twista single (2010)
- Runner Runner - "So Obvious" single (2010)
- Runner Runner - Runner Runner album (2010)
- Big Heed and Alien - "Tipsy" single (2010)
