= Jack Ponti =

American songwriter (1958–2024)

- Born: Giacomo Pontoriero; February 16, 1958; Newark, New Jersey, U.S.
- Origin: Red Bank, New Jersey, U.S.
- Died: October 7, 2024 (aged 66) Red Bank, New Jersey, U.S.
- Genres: Rock, hard rock
- Occupations: Musician, songwriter, record producer, talent manager, CEO
- Instruments: guitar, bass, keyboards
- Years active: 1970s–2024
- Labels: Merovee Records, Merovingian Music
- Website: Merovee Records website

Giacomo Pontoriero (February 16, 1958 – October 7, 2024), known as Jack Ponti, was an American musician, songwriter, record producer, manager, label executive, and consultant.

== Career ==
Ponti was an American musician, songwriter, record producer, manager, label executive, and consultant who started his career in the music business playing guitar in the rock band The Rest in his native New Jersey in the late '70s. The Rest featured a young Jon Bon Jovi as vocalist, but despite promotion by other successful New Jersey musicians, such as Southside Johnny and members of Bruce Springsteen's E Street Band, and a demo produced by Billy Squier, did not obtain a recording contract and split up. Jon Bon Jovi went to form his own band Bon Jovi, which in the following years gained worldwide success and multi-million record sales, while Ponti found a job as songwriter and producer for other rock bands. The late music business legend Ahmet Ertegun gave Ponti his first production job and the two grew close.

In the late '80s and early '90s, Ponti co-wrote songs for Bon Jovi, Alice Cooper, Keel, Trixter, Nelson, Kane Roberts, Joe Lynn Turner, Bonfire and other artists. He also produced and wrote albums for hard rock and glam metal bands Babylon A.D., Baton Rouge, Doro and for his own band Surgin', which he had created in 1985 at the insistence of his then managers. Surgin' disbanded after one record, though subsequent compilations have been released of early demos. Surgin' still has a strong following in the AOR community.

During the last period of popularity of glam metal, he was deeply involved with American glam metal bands Skid Row and Nelson. In 1991 he retired from the music business for a few years. During this time he built a gym, a martial arts school, and devoted his energies to martial arts and dogs, especially the rare breed Fila Brasileiro.

He came back in 1996, approaching the music business as a talent manager and record label owner. In 1998, he founded CazzyDog Management and became the manager of R&B artist and Grammy Awards winner India.Arie who was nominated for a record 7 Grammy awards as a debut artist, a record that is still held by her today. Other clients in the CazzyDog roster included: Boyz II Men, Az Yet, Mike E., Pru, and Scarface. Amongst the writer/producers they managed were Carlos (Six July) Broady. N.O. Joe Johnson, Mary Brown, all of the writers under Teddy Riley, and a host of others.

In 2004 he founded both Bardic Records and the Platform Group. Both companies were designed to work within the ever expanding "indie" sector. Both ventures were dismantled after a reconfiguration.

Ponti was later the CEO of Merovingian Music, a non-genre record label founded in 2006, with strong partnerships within the industry and a roster of pop, indie rock, hip hop and heavy metal artists. Merovingian Music had joint ventures with both Capitol Records and Jive Records and later merged with C.E Music, a label owned by David Letterman's Worldwide Pants production company.

Ponti died on October 7, 2024, at the age of 66.

== Discography ==
=== Produced albums ===
- Surgin' – When Midnight Comes (1985)
- Baton Rouge – Shake Your Soul (1990)
- Baton Rouge – Lights out on the Playground (1991)
- China Rain – Bed of Nails (1991)
- Lance Keltner – Lance Keltner (1992)
- Doro – Angels Never Die (1993)
- Doro – Machine II Machine (1995)
- Baton Rouge – Baton Rouge (1997)
- Angry Tears – Angry Tears (2000)
- Holyday Express – Greatest Hits (2000)
- Sinopoli – The Eyes Never Lie (2002)
- Surgin' – Tokyo Rose (2003)
- Surgin' – Electric Nights the Final Chapter (2003)
- Jack Ponti Presents vol. 1 (2003)
- Kittie – Funeral for Yesterday (2007)
- Otep – Smash the Control Machine (2009)
- Runner Runner – Runner Runner (2011)

=== Songs written or co-written ===
- Bon Jovi – "Shot Through the Heart" from the album Bon Jovi (1984)
- Glen Burtnik – "Follow You" from the album Heroes & Zeroes (1987)
- Keel – "Somebody's Waiting" from the album Keel (1987)
- Bonfire – "Sweet Obsession" from the album Fireworks (1987)
- Bonfire – "Hard on Me" from the album Point Blank (1989)
- Babylon A.D. – "The Kid Goes Wild" from the album Babylon A.D. (1989)
- Baton Rouge – "The Price of Love" from the album Lights out on the Playground (1991)
- Alice Cooper – "Hey Stoopid", "Love's a Loaded Gun" from the album Hey Stoopid (1991)
- Doro – "Enough for You", "Bad Blood" and "Last Day of My Life" from the album Angels Never Die (1993)
- Eric Gales Band – "Paralyzed" from the album Picture of a Thousand Faces (1993)
- Doro – "Ceremony" and "In Freiheit Stirbt Mein Herz" from the album Machine II Machine (1995)
- Nelson – "We Always Want What We Can't Get" from the album Imaginator (1996)
- Melvin Taylor & The Slack Band – "Bang That Bell" from the album Bang That Bell (2000)
