= Runner Runner (disambiguation) =

Runner Runner is a 2013 American crime thriller film.

Runner Runner may also refer to:

- Runner Runner (band), an American band
  - Runner Runner (album), a 2011 album by the band
- Runner-runner, a poker term
