= Best Of (Doro album) =

Compilation album by Doro
- Released: 2 November 1998
- Genres: Hard rock, heavy metal
- Length: 46:17
- Label: Vertigo / Mercury

Doro chronology
The Ballads (1998)	Best Of (1998)	Earth Shaker Rock (1999)

Professional ratings
Review scores
Source	Rating
AllMusic	3.5/5 stars

Best Of is a compilation of songs released by the German hard rock singer Doro Pesch and by her former band Warlock with the label Vertigo Records. The compilation was published after the singer had left the label in 1996, ending a ten years long collaboration.

== Track listing ==
No.	Title	Originally from	Length
1.	"Cool Love"	True at Heart	3:44
2.	"Ceremony (Metal Hammer mix)"	Machine II Machine: Electric Club Mixes	3:56
3.	"Bad Blood"	Angels Never Die	3:50
4.	"All We Are"	Triumph and Agony	3:19
5.	"Let's Rock Forever" (live)	Doro Live	2:20
6.	"Rare Diamonds"	Doro	3:35
7.	"Angels with Dirty Faces"	Force Majeure	3:59
8.	"You Ain't Lived (Till You're Loved to Death)"	Angels Never Die	4:03
9.	"Hear Me"	True at Heart	3:43
10.	"Burning the Witches" (live)	Doro Live	3:29
11.	"Ceremony (Rattlesnake Bite mix)"	Machine II Machine	5:05
12.	"Tie Me Up (Hard & Fast mix)"	Machine II Machine: Electric Club Mixes	5:14
