= The Ballads (Doro album) =

Compilation album by Doro
- Released: 22 July 1998
- Genres: Hard rock, heavy metal
- Length: 55:18
- Label: Vertigo / Mercury

Doro chronology
Love Me in Black (1998)	The Ballads (1998)	Best Of (1998)

Professional ratings
Review scores
Source	Rating
AllMusic	3.5/5 stars
Metal Hammer (GER)	5/7 stars

The Ballads is a compilation of songs released by the German hard rock singer Doro Pesch and by her former band Warlock with the label Vertigo Records. The compilation was published after the singer had left the label in 1996, ending a ten years long collaboration.

== Track listing ==
No.	Title	Originally from	Length
1.	"In Freiheit, Stirbt Mein Herz ('In Freedom, My Heart Dies')"	Machine II Machine	3:50
2.	"You Got Me Singing"	B-side of the single "In Freiheit, Stirbt Mein Herz"	4:43
3.	"Children of the Night"	B-side of the single "Bad Blood"	4:15
4.	"Fall for Me Again"	True at Heart	3:20
5.	"A Whiter Shade of Pale"	Force Majeure	3:49
6.	"Last Day of My Life"	Angels Never Die	4:24
7.	"Für Immer ('Forever')"	Triumph and Agony	4:12
8.	"I'll Make It on My Own"	True at Heart	4:06
9.	"Enough for You"	Angels Never Die	3:44
10.	"I'll Be Holding On"	Doro	5:22
11.	"So Alone Together"	Angels Never Die	5:40
12.	"Light in the Window"	Machine II Machine	4:24
13.	"Alles Ist Gut ('Everything Is Good')"	Angels Never Die	3:29

== Charts ==
Chart (1998)	Peak position
German Albums (Offizielle Top 100)	85
