= Take the Wheel =

Take the Wheel may refer to:

- "Take The Wheel", a song by Tokyo Rose from the album Reinventing a Lost Art
- "Take the Wheel", a song by Susumu Hirasawa from the album Aurora
- "Take The Wheel", a song by Deric Ruttan from the album Deric Ruttan

== See also ==
- Taking the Wheel, album by David Campbell
- "I'm Taking the Wheel", a song by SHeDAISY
- "Jesus, Take the Wheel", a song by Carrie Underwood
- "Someone Take the Wheel", a song by The Replacements from the album All Shook Down
