= Painkillers (Brian Fallon album) =

Studio album by Brian Fallon
- Released: March 11, 2016
- Recorded: 2015
- Length: 40:33
- Label: Island
- Producer: Butch Walker

Brian Fallon chronology
Painkillers (2016)	Georgia (2016)

Singles from Painkillers
- 1. "A Wonderful Life" Released: December 11, 2015

Painkillers is the debut studio album by Brian Fallon, singer/guitarist of American rock band The Gaslight Anthem, released on March 11, 2016, through Island Records.

== Background ==
Fallon began writing songs for what would become Painkillers before The Gaslight Anthem's 2014 release, Get Hurt, thinking there would be more time off before Get Hurt. He wrote new material and had some from another band of his, Molly and the Zombies, to use for Painkillers already. When the Get Hurt project started, Fallon put the new songs aside to focus on The Gaslight Anthem, realizing that the new songs he initially thought could be The Gaslight Anthem songs would not fit well with the direction the band was going with for Get Hurt. The band knew there would be a hiatus before it was made public so Fallon began writing more songs and put together a plan for the solo release. Following the announced hiatus of The Gaslight Anthem in July 2015, Fallon entered a Nashville studio to record Painkillers with producer Butch Walker, who also plays guitar on the album. Catherine Popper plays bass and Mark Stepro plays drums on the album.

== Promotion ==
In support of the album, Fallon toured portions of the United States, Canada and Europe throughout 2016. Fallon was accompanied by a full band, including Catherine Popper, The Gaslight Anthem guitarist Alex Rosamilia and The Horrible Crowes guitarist Ian Perkins. The band performed songs from Painkillers and also from Elsie, the album from the other band of Fallon and Perkins, The Horrible Crowes.

Fallon performed "A Wonderful Life" on The Late Show with Stephen Colbert on March 10, 2016. Fallon also performed "A Wonderful Life" on The Daily Show on March 16, 2016.

== Singles ==
The lead single from Painkillers, "A Wonderful Life", was premiered on The Wall Street Journal's website on December 10, 2015, a day before its digital release date of December 11, 2015. "A Wonderful Life" was then serviced to alternative radio on January 12, 2016.

Prior to the album's release, four additional songs were released to digital stores and streaming services. The songs were "Nobody Wins" (January 22), "Smoke" (February 5), "Steve McQueen" (February 19) and "Painkillers" (March 4).

== Reception ==
Professional ratings
Aggregate scores
Source	Rating
Metacritic	78/100
Review scores
Source	Rating
AbsolutePunk	9/10
AllMusic	4/5 stars
Alternative Press	8/10
American Songwriter	4/5 stars
Exclaim!	8/10
The Independent	3/5 stars
MOJO	4/5 stars
Q	3/5 stars
Rolling Stone	3.5/5 stars
Uncut	7/10

=== Critical ===
Painkillers received mostly positive reviews from music critics. At Metacritic, which assigns a normalized rating out of 100 to reviews from mainstream critics, the album has an average score of 78 out of 100, which indicates "generally favorable reviews" based on 17 reviews.

Jonathan Bernstein of Rolling Stone rated the album three and a half stars out of five and writes, "Painkillers isn't quite a rebirth, but with his band struggling to stay vibrant in recent years, it feels a little like a new morning." Writing for Classic Rock, Emma Johnston states "Fallon doesn't really need the backup of a regular band. With this debut he's placed his stake as an American singer-songwriter of style and substance." In a three out of five star rating, Jess Denham of The Independent calls it "solid, genuinely inspired songwriting that The Gaslight Anthem fans will enjoy." Adam Feibel of Exclaim! rated the album eight out of ten and writes, "Fallon's songwriting is warm and varied, and there's more soul and character in his voice than ever before."

=== Commercial ===
The album debuted at No. 30 on the Billboard 200, and No. 3 on the Top Rock Albums chart, selling 14,000 copies on its first week of release.

=== Accolades ===
Publication	Rank	List
American Songwriter	29	Top 50 Albums of 2016

== Track listing ==
Sources: iTunes and ASCAP

No.	Title	Writer(s)	Length
1.	"A Wonderful Life"	Brian Fallon	3:11
2.	"Painkillers"	Fallon, Butch Walker	3:06
3.	"Among Other Foolish Things"	Fallon	2:59
4.	"Smoke"	Fallon	3:43
5.	"Steve McQueen"	Fallon, Dan Wilson	3:21
6.	"Nobody Wins"	Fallon, Walker	2:48
7.	"Rosemary"	Fallon	3:39
8.	"Red Lights"	Fallon	3:36
9.	"Long Drives"	Fallon	3:35
10.	"Honey Magnolia"	Fallon	3:29
11.	"Mojo Hand"	Fallon, Walker	3:30
12.	"Open All Night"	Fallon	3:36
13.	"The Blues, Mary (Bonus Track 7" Single Box)"	Fallon	3:41
14.	"Digging in the Dirt (Bonus Track 7" Single Box)"	Peter Gabriel	4:04
Total length:			40:33

== Personnel ==
Credits adapted from AllMusic

Musicians

- Brian Fallon – bass, guitar, organ, percussion, vocals
- Josh Kaler – pedal steel guitar
- Catherine Popper – bass, background vocals
- Alex Rosamilia – piano
- Mark Stepro – drums, background vocals
- Todd Stopera – guitar
- Butch Walker – banjo, bass, clapping, drums, glockenspiel, guitar, twelve-string acoustic guitar, mandolin, percussion, piano, stomping, background vocals

Technical personnel

- Michael Brauer – mixing
- Matt Burnette-Lemon – package production
- Danny Clinch – photography
- Joe LaPorta – mastering
- David Massey – A&R
- Joe Spix – art direction
- Todd Stopera – engineer
- Butch Walker – engineer, production
- Steve Yegelwel – A&R

== Charts ==
Chart (2016)	Peak position
Australian Albums (ARIA)	36
Austrian Albums (Ö3 Austria)	20
Belgian Albums (Ultratop Flanders)	58
Canadian Albums (Billboard)	27
Dutch Albums (Album Top 100)	44
German Albums (Offizielle Top 100)	12
Irish Albums (IRMA)	35
Scottish Albums (OCC)	3
Swiss Albums (Schweizer Hitparade)	57
UK Albums (OCC)	13
UK Americana Albums (OCC)	1
US Billboard 200	30
US Digital Albums (Billboard)	10
US Top Alternative Albums (Billboard)	2
US Top Rock Albums (Billboard)	3

== Release history ==
Source: Amazon.com

Region	Date	Format(s)	Label
United States	March 11, 2016	CD; digital download; vinyl	Island
