= All About Records =

- Founded: 1997
- Founder: Russell Orcutt
- Distributor: The Militia Group
- Genre: Hardcore punk, pop punk, alternative rock, punk rock, ska punk, rock
- Country of origin: United States
- Location: Taunton, Massachusetts
- Official website: allaboutrecords.org

All About Records was an American record label founded in 1997 by Russell Orcutt Released albums by such bands as Tokyo Rose, Smackin' Isaiah, and Lanemeyer.

== History ==
Russ Orcutt founded All About Records to release a 7" for his friends in new bedford hardcore outfit All Chrome in 1997. The label quickly grew with releases from bands such as The Action Taken, later named Have Heart and Tokyo Rose's Chasing Fireflies EP which received distribution through The Militia Group.

In later years, The label expanded to the United Kingdom and focused on selling merch geared towards comicon event goers.

=== Inactive artists ===
- The Action Taken
- Adams Shore
- All Chrome
- Another Option
- Arcade Academy
- Blackletter
- Brookside
- Calumet-Hecla
- Chase the moment
- The Chase Scene
- The Cheat!
- Damaged Goods
- Do it for Johnny
- Drive til' Morning
- Dyingforit
- Eighty-Six
- End it all
- Farwell Hope
- Garrison
- Jeff Caudill
- Jericho (now known as Smoke or Fire)
- Jesuscentric
- Kobe
- Lanemeyer
- Orange Island
- The Passing Moment
- Remember Paris (now known as The Drama State)
- Run Like Hell
- Select Start
- Smackin' Isaiah
- Sometimes She Burns
- Stereoepic
- Tokyo Rose
- Windmill
- The Forever Endeavor
