= Over It (band) =

American pop-punk band

- Origin: Alexandria, Virginia
- Genres: Pop-punk; punk rock; skate punk; melodic hardcore; alternative rock
- Years active: 1998–2007
- Labels: Negative Progression; Lobster; Virgin
- Spinoffs: Runner Runner
- Past members: Peter Munters; Seth Watts; Nick Bailey; James Ulrich; Ryan Ogren

Over It was an American rock band based in Orange County, California. Originally from Alexandria, Virginia, the band formed in 1998 to play pop-punk. Although they were most recently signed to Virgin Records, Over It is currently unsigned and inactive.

== History ==
The band, originally a four-piece, started out on Negative Progression Records, who released their debut album The Ready Series on April 25, 2000. They promoted it with a US tour between June and August 2000. In December 2000 and January 2001, the band toured the south-eastern and midwestern US states with the Stryder. The band signed to Lobster Records in December 2001. In early 2002, Over It toured across the US with And So It Begins. Over It released a split with My Captain in June 2002, following which both bands toured in July and August. In June, the band played two weeks of shows with Near Miss. Preceded by the free download of "Nothing Serious" on July 18, 2002, the band released Timing Is Everything on September 3, 2002.

In October and November 2002, Over It toured across the US east coast; in January and February 2003, they toured across California. In June, the band released an acoustic split with Junction 18. The following month, the band appeared on the Radioactive Stage of Warped Tour. Between September and November 2003, the band supported Rufio and Motion City Soundtrack on a co-headlining cross country tour. On November 18, Timing Is Everything was reissued as an enhanced CD. In April 2004, the band went on tour with the Matches, which was followed by a stint with A Wilhelm Scream in May. In July and August, the band appeared on Warped Tour. They toured the West Coast with Tokyo Rose, My New Life and Park, and then toured with the Gamits and National Product the following month.

The music video for "Siren on the 101" was posted online on January 24, 2005. Over It went on a West Coast tour in February 2005 with Killradio and Acceptance. They released Silverstrand on March 8, 2005; in the two months leading up to its release, a new song from it was posted online on a weekly basis. Silverstrand chronicles the band's move to southern California, and is their most focused work to date. The band added Ryan Ogren as an extra guitar player. Over It toured the US in March and April 2005 with Tsunami Bomb and the F-Ups. Following this, they appeared at The Bamboozle festival in April 2005, tour with Gatsbys American Dream and Rufio, and released a split single with Punchline on April 26, 2005. In June 2005, they supported Halifax on their headlining tour, and played a few shows with Motion City Soundtrack, prior to an appearance on that year's Warped Tour.

In October and November 2005, Over It supported Relient K on their headlining US tour. On December 12, 2005, the band announced they had signed to major label Virgin Records. They went on a brief tour of Japan with Rufio and This Day and Age. In March 2006, the band began recording their upcoming album for Virgin Records with producer Mike Green. In April and May 2006, the band performed on the Virgin College Mega Tour alongside Yellowcard, leading up to an appearance at The Bamboozle festival. On June 13, 2006, "Too Much Information" was posted on the band's Myspace profile, followed by "Gunslinger" a month later. On July 20, 2006, Step Outside Yourself was announced for release in the following month.

Negative Progression combined the band's early EPs into the compilation Outer Banks, and reissued The Ready Series under the name Welcome to Virginia; both of these were released on July 25, 2006. On August 1, 2006, "Think Against the Grain" was posted on the band's Myspace. Step Outside Yourself was released on August 29, 2006. On September 20, 2006, the music video for "Siren on the 101" was posted online. In November and December 2006, the band supported Goo Goo Dolls on their headlining US tour. In September 2007, the band released The Strand, a compilation of rare and acoustic tracks, through their webstore. Its release was preceded by "Anyday".

In April 2008, the members announced they were not breaking up, despite focusing their efforts on their other band Runner Runner. The following month, Step Outside Yourself was released in Europe through Wynona Records. On August 28, 2012, Munters released his first solo acoustic album, Wood & Wire. During interviews to promote that album, he confirmed that Over It has not disbanded, and speculated about a reunion and new material. On May 31, 2020, Munters appeared on the song "Wasteland" which can be found the "Chasm" EP by Vice Years.

== Discography ==
Studio albums

- The Ready Series (2000)
  - The Ready Series was remastered and re-released as Welcome to Virginia in 2006.
- Timing is Everything (2002)
- Silverstrand (2005)
- Step Outside Yourself (2006)

Compilation albums

- Outer Banks (2006)
- The Strand (2007)

EPs

- Over It (1999)
- Hindsight 20/20 (2001)
  - Both Over It and Hindsight 20/20 were remastered and re-released as Outer Banks in 2006.
- The Acoustic Split with Junction 18 (2003)

== Personnel ==
- Peter Munters (lead vocals, guitar)
- Nick Bailey (guitar)
- Ryan Ogren (guitar, background vocals)
- Seth Watts (bass, background vocals)
- James Ulrich (drums)
