= New American Saint =

Studio album by Tokyo Rose
- Released: October 4, 2005
- Genre: Pop punk
- Label: Sidecho

Tokyo Rose chronology
Reinventing a Lost Art (2003)	New American Saint (2005)	The Promise in Compromise (2007)

Professional ratings
Review scores
Source	Rating
AllMusic	4/5 stars
PunkNews	4.5/5 stars
PunkTastic	(unfavorable)
ThePunkSite	(favorable)

New American Saint is the second album by the New Jersey based United States group, Tokyo Rose. The record was released by Sidecho Records on October 4, 2005. The album quietly strays away from the more punk-ish sound brought by previous effort, Reinventing a Lost Art.

== Video ==
Tokyo Rose recorded a video for the first track on the album, "Spectacle". The video was directed by Daniel Yourd at Endeavormedia. The band also appeared on MTVU's, The Freshmen, talking about the record and the video for "Spectacle".

== Track listing ==
1. Spectacle (3:38)
2. New American Saint (3:26)
3. Goodbye Almond Eyes (4:03)
4. The Tin Man Gets His Heart (4:45)
5. Treading Water (4:35)
6. Bottle Marked: Caution (3:38)
7. The Hard Eight (3:24)
8. A Reason to Come Home Again (3:23)
9. I Love You... Too (3:59)
10. The Hammer and the Nail (4:03)
11. Meghan Again (3:32)
