= Hi-Skool Trivia =

EP by Emanuel Nice
- Released: 1999
- Genre: Emo, indie rock, punk rock
- Label: Roddog Records

Emanuel Nice chronology
Hi-Skool Trivia (1999)	Lanemeyer/Emanuel Nice Split (2000)

Hi-Skool Trivia is the debut EP released by the band Emanuel Nice, in 1999. It was released by the German label Roddog Records.

Emanuel Nice consisted of teenage musicians, Matt Breen (vocals/guitar), Bryan Whiteman (bass), Matthew Barber (guitar), and Anthony Brock (drums).

The band changed their name to Emanuel, just before being signed with Vagrant Records in late 2004.

== Track listing ==
No.	Title	Length
1.	"Days Of My Life"
2.	"Almost Alright"
3.	"Shawna"
4.	"Inviso-Boy"
5.	"Far Away"
6.	"Ryder"
7.	"Vacation"
8.	"Hi-Skool Trivia"

== See also ==
- Punk rock
- Indie rock
