= Life In-Between =

Studio album by Royal Bliss
- Released: January 13, 2009
- Recorded: August–September, 2007; The Commune (Oregon)
- Genres: Hard rock, post-grunge
- Length: 43:10
- Labels: Merovingian Music MRV10; Caroline Records; Capitol Records
- Producers: Rob Daiker; Matt Winegar

Royal Bliss chronology
After The Chaos 2 (2006)	Life In-Between (2009)	Waiting Out the Storm (2012)

Singles from Life In-Between
- 1. "Save Me" Released: July 15, 2008; 2. "I Was Drunk" Released: November 2008; 3. "We Did Nothing Wrong" Released: 2009

Professional ratings
Review scores
Source	Rating
TuneLab Music	link
Ultimate-Guitar.com	7.7/10 link
Unrated Magazine	favorable link

Life In-Between is the debut album by American rock band Royal Bliss. It was released January 13, 2009 as a joint collaboration between Merovingian Music and Caroline Records under the exclusive license to Capitol Records. The album's first single, "Save Me," was released July 15, 2008. It is currently available for sale digitally at all major online retailers (iTunes, Amazon, Rhapsody, etc.). The song impacted radio only one day earlier on the 14th with a total of 11 adds at radio and climbing to 25 within a few days. Merovingian Music (abrv MRV) has released two web sites to accompany and promote the new single "Save Me." The first is an interactive e-card which provides to anyone that may be unfamiliar, an excellent introduction to the band. The second is a media packed web tools site for those who want to take action and promote. This site provides to the public a plethora of marketing tools and the necessary knowledge to use them effectively.

In October 2008 the band's label released the first video single for the song, "Save Me." To coincide with the videos release, ThePuppetVideo.com was put in place to view the video and help raise awareness. The video features a protagonist puppet used to explore the band's tormented psyche and shows the devolution and decline of the human condition when all hope is lost. A masked man in stop-motion symbolizes the character in a state of emotional decay and turmoil as he morphs into an actual puppet who is void of feeling, emotion and life itself, thus symbolizing that the fight is over and that he has lost all resemblance to his former self and has now become completely dehumanized.

The album was promoted by 97.5 The Blaze, a radio station in Salt Lake City under the call sign KZZQ (formerly KHTB). Also, the songs "Devils & Angels" and "Here They Come" were originally released on the band's previous album, After the Chaos II. In addition to those two tracks, the song "Brave" was also re-recorded for the album, but didn't make it.

== Track listing ==
All Songs Published By Royal Bliss LLC, (ASCAP)

1. "Save Me" (Bruschke, Harding, Middleton, Mortensen, Richards, Smith) – 3:12
2. "Here They Come" (Bruschke, Harding, Middleton, Mortensen, Richards, Smith) – 3:23
3. "Devils & Angels" (Bruschke, Harding, Middleton, Mortensen, Richards, Smith) – 3:41
4. "Pocket of Dreams" (Middleton and Royal Bliss) – 3:47
5. "Finally Figured Out" (Harding, Middleton, Mortensen, Richards, Smith, Winegar) – 4:36
6. "We Did Nothing Wrong" (Harding, Middleton, Mortensen, Richards, Smith, Winegar) – 3:38
7. "By & By" (Middleton and Royal Bliss) – 3:24
8. "Wash It All Away" (Bruschke, Harding, Middleton, Mortensen, Richards, Smith) – 3:02
9. "Whiskey" (Bruschke, Harding, Middleton, Mortensen, Richards, Smith) – 3:02
10. "Fancy Things" (Harding, Middleton, Mortensen, Richards, Powell, Smith) – 4:18
11. "I Don't Mind" (Middleton and Royal Bliss) – 3:10
12. "I Was Drunk" (Middleton and Royal Bliss) – 4:04

== Cut from Album ==
1. "Brave"
2. "Music Man" (On Japanese Release)

== Members ==
- Neal Middleton – lead vocals
- Taylor Richards – Acoustic & Electric guitars & background vocals
- Chris Harding – Electric guitar & background Vocals
- Tommy Mortensen – Electric bass guitar, Upright Bass & background Vocals
- Jake Smith – Drums, Percussion & background Vocals

== Liner notes ==
- Producer: Rob Daiker and Royal Bliss
- "Devils and Angels" produced by: Rob Daiker, Matt Winegar and Royal Bliss
- Mixed by: Rob Daiker
- Engineered by: Matt Winegar
- Mastered by: Ryan Foster at Freq Mastering in Portland, OR
- Recorded at: The Commune in Portland, OR
- Additional Recording at: Winegar Studios in Salt Lake City, UT
- Mixed at: Kung Fu Bakery in Portland, OR and at The Commune in Portland, OR
- Additional Pro Tools Editing: Tyson Griffin
- Additional Musicians: Rob Daiker and Matt Winegar...Guitars, Piano, Percussion, and background Vocals
- Additional Background Vocals: Gus Nicklos (From The Mediam) & The Little Revolution Singers
- String Arrangements, Recorded & Engineered: Kyle Lockwood at Setec Recording Studio Portland, OR
- Additional Production: Steven Walker & Additional Engineering by Joe Varela
- Strings Section performed by: Kyle Lockwood (Cello & Contrabass) & Nelly Kovalev (Violin & Viola)
- A&R: Marc Nathan
- Management: Steve Walker For Contraband Management and Sam Kaiser for DefConOne Entertainment
- Legal Representation: Lisa E. Socransky
- Booking: Andrew Goodfriend for TKO
- CD Graphics and Art Direction: Jake Smith and Royal Bliss
- Layout and Design: Greg Edgerton for Macabre Studios
