= Baton Rouge (band) =

American rock band

- Baton Rouge in 1991. L-R: Scott Bender, Lance Bulen, Kelly Keeling, Corky McClellan, and David Cremin.

Background information
- Origin: Pearl River, Louisiana, U.S.
- Genres: Hard rock, glam metal
- Years active: 1986–1991, 1997, 2009
- Labels: Atlantic, East West, MTM Music
- Past members: Kelly Keeling; Lance Bulen; Scott Bender; Corky McClellan; David L. Cremin; Tony Palmucci; Keith Harrison; Harold Knappenberger; Brian Scott; Jack Ponti; Pat Schick; Guy Daniel; Camus Celli

Baton Rouge was an American hard rock band formed in 1986 in Pearl River, Louisiana. The band produced two albums and enjoyed limited success during the final part of the hair metal explosion in the early 1990s, before disbanding. All the band members went on to work with other hard rock recording artists, guitarist Lance Bulen with Puzzle Gut and Kingbaby, vocalist Kelly Keeling with Michael Schenker Group and Trans-Siberian Orchestra.

== History ==
The group was originally composed of Lance Bulen (vocals), Kelly Keeling (guitars and keyboards), Keith Harrison (bass) and Harold Knappenberger III (drums). The group began their career under the name Voices, later changed to Cheetah, then to Meridian, finally changed to "Baton Rouge", which Ahmet Ertegun asked for, so some roots from Louisiana would be part of the name and because of the similar name of the band Meridian.

The band relocated to Los Angeles in 1987, experiencing changes of personnel and roles within the group. Keeling assumed the role of frontman after producer/songwriter David Foster sat down with Lance and said that Kelly's voice for the songs fit the band better. After that conversation, Bulen became lead guitarist and backing vocalist, Bryan Scott bassist and Corky McClellan drummer. The band, still under the name Cheetah, signed to MCA Records and produced a demo and a song with Jack Ponti, before Scott departed and was replaced by Scott Bender. In 1989, after only six shows in Los Angeles clubs, Atlantic Records put the band under contract. With the collaboration of the two songwriting members of the band Surgin', Jack Ponti and Vic Pepe (the first had worked on the first album of Bon Jovi), Baton Rouge began rehearsing material for their first album. Meanwhile, in 1989, Keeling, Bulen, and Ponti, contributed some songs for the album Point Blank of the German hard rock band Bonfire.

The debut album of Baton Rouge, Shake Your Soul, was published in 1990 with the production of Jack Ponti. The album saw the participation of several guest musicians, from drummer Frankie LaRocka of Company of Wolves and the band of John Waite, to Joey Franco, drummer of Good Rats and Twisted Sister, as well as Bobby Gordon and Randy Cantor on keyboards. The track "There Was a Time (The Storm)" was co-written with Jaime Kyle. Keyboard player David L. Cremin is credited in the album and is pictured on the back cover but he did not participate in the recordings. Shake Your Soul peaked at No. 160 in the U.S. charts.

Baton Rouge underwent a change of label and another change of formation for the recording of their second album, with the addition of former Keel guitarist Tony Palmucci in place of Cremin. Their second album Lights Out on the Playground was released in 1991 and included the song "Desperate", written by Jack Ponti and Derek Davis and previously recorded by Babylon A.D. on their album with the same name. The album did not enter the American charts and was a commercial failure. Keeling was very unsatisfied with the music Baton Rouge had been playing and of the band itself, so when he received the offer to enter in Blue Murder, a group founded by guitarist John Sykes (Tygers of Pan Tang, Thin Lizzy, Whitesnake), he accepted the proposal. Consequently, Baton Rouge disbanded in 1991.

=== After the dissolution ===
Kelly Keeling performed with Blue Murder until 1994 and then collaborated with former Europe guitarist John Norum (1995–1997), Michael Schenker (1999), Erik Norlander (2003), Dokken (2004) and George Lynch (2004) for both their tours and solo efforts. He also pursues a solo career as musician and vocalist. In 2006 he became the vocalist of the Trans-Siberian Orchestra.

Lance Bulen collaborated with Paul Sabu and Dave Spitz, former bassist of White Lion and Black Sabbath, in a quartet called Insomnia (1993–1994) and in 1996 founded the band Puzzlegut, with former member of XYZ Patt Fontain. Bulen finally formed the band KingBaby in 2004, where he is the lead vocalist and guitarist. He has also worked as touring and session musician with many rock artists during his career after Baton Rouge dissolution.

Tony Palmucci was a session and touring player for Twisted Sister's vocalist Dee Snider solo projects.

In 1997, Jack Ponti returned to record production after a few years hiatus with a new Baton Rouge album based on some old demos and recruited Keeling as vocalist for the project. Ponti played guitars and keyboards on the album, with the help of bassist Pat Schick, keyboard player Guy Daniel and drummer Camus Celli. In September 1997, the German label MTM Music published the album under the title Baton Rouge. Two of the tracks included on the album were written in collaboration with Stan Bush and "Love's a Loaded Gun" was a cover of the song composed by Ponti, Vic Pepe and Alice Cooper, which appeared on Cooper's album Hey Stoopid of 1991. The reformed Baton Rouge lasted only for the recording the album. In fact, Keeling never considered the group as a reunion of Baton Rouge.

The original lineup of Baton Rouge reunited in 2009 to perform at the Rocklahoma rock music festival held in Pryor, Oklahoma. A permanent reunion of the band never materialized.

== Band members ==
Initial lineup

- Kelly Keeling – lead vocals (1987–1991, 1997, 2009), guitars (1986–1991, 1997, 2009), backing vocals, keyboards (1986–87)
- Lance Bulen – guitars, backing vocals (1987–1991, 2009); lead vocals (1986–87)
- Keith Harrison – bass (1986–1987)
- Harold Knappenberger – drums (1986–1987)

Subsequent members

- Bryan Scott – bass (1987–1988)
- Scott Bender – bass, backing vocals (1989–1991, 2009)
- Corky McClellan – drums, backing vocals, percussion, acoustic guitar (1987–1991, 2009)
- David L. Cremin – keyboards, guitar, backing vocals (1990–1991, 2009)
- Tony Palmucci – guitar, backing vocals (1991)

1997 album contributors

- Jack Ponti – guitars, backing vocals, keyboards (1997)
- Guy Daniel – keyboards, backing vocals (1997)
- Pat Schick – bass (1997)
- Camus Celli – drums (1997)

2009 Rocklahoma participants

- Kelly Keeling – lead vocals, guitar
- Lance Bulen – guitar, backing vocals
- Scott Bender – bass, backing vocals
- Harold Knappenberger – drums, backing vocals
- David Cremin – guitar, backing vocals, keyboards

Timeline

== Discography ==
=== Studio albums ===
- Shake Your Soul (1990) (U.S. No. 160)
- Lights Out on the Playground (1991)
- Baton Rouge (1997)

=== Compilation albums ===
- The Hottest of Baton Rouge (2006)

=== Music videos ===
- "Walks Like a Woman" (1990)
- "The Price of Love" (1991)
