= Emanuel (band) =

American post-hardcore band

- Also known as: Emanuel Nice
- Origin: Louisville, Kentucky, U.S.
- Genres: Post-hardcore, emo, alternative rock
- Years active: 1998–2008
- Labels: Vagrant, Roddog
- Past members: Matthew Breen; Mat Barber; Bryan Whiteman; Anthony Brock; Devin Triplett

Emanuel was an American post-hardcore band from Louisville, Kentucky. It was formed in 1998 under the lesser-known name Emanuel Nice and appeared on four self-released records, before being signed to Vagrant Records and changing the name in 2004. Since then, Emanuel has released a debut album, Soundtrack to a Headrush, and a second album Black Earth Tiger.

According to Alternative Press, the band's style has been emulated by newcomers in the years following their breakup. They are considered by some to be a "scene band".

== History ==
After 14-year-old high school students Matt Breen and Bryan Whiteman met Anthony Brock and Mat Barber (who attended another school, Providence, in Clarksville, Indiana) at Six Flags Kentucky Kingdom, the quartet decided to form the garage band Emanuel Nice in 1998.

Emanuel Nice recorded a rather inept eight-song EP called Hi-Skool Trivia in December 1998. The CD was issued the following year through the German underground record label, Roddog Records, which was run by friends of the band. In the following years, while still in high school, Emanuel Nice appeared on two split records—one with New Jersey's already renowned Lanemeyer, another with the German punk band Colourbone—before recording their second EP, Wait, in 2002. However, despite much touring and local performances, none of these releases led to even local stardom.

In 2004, the band's name was shortened to Emanuel, in conjunction with the musical renovation they underwent. Even though their line-up only slightly changed throughout the six years from the band's formation, the sound evolved drastically from "poppy and terrible, it's kind of embarrassing", as singer/guitarist Breen put it, to a darker, more mature blend of indie and emo genres. With cynical lyrics and aggressive guitar melodies, the band's new sound earned them a recording contract with Vagrant Records, who released their first album, Soundtrack to a Headrush, in March 2005. Guitarist Devin Triplett was recruited to take over for Matt Breen in 2005.

Shortly after the record's release, the band took part in the 2005 Vans Warped Tour.

In March 2006, Emanuel played an arena tour of the US supporting Thirty Seconds to Mars with Aiden and Keating. On the tour for their first album, the band also did tours with From Autumn To Ashes, The Bled, My American Heart, Lorene Drive, Moneen, The Audition and others.

The band spent the summer of 2006 on the Van's Warped Tour once again. The band began to play a new song in their setlist, "My Antapex", from the then-forthcoming LP, Black Earth Tiger.

In January 2007, the band entered the recording studio with producer Terry Date to begin recording Black Earth Tiger. The album was released on August 28, 2007. The album is notable for once-again featuring a drastic change in sound from the band – from fast and catchy to very dark, spacey, and emotional while still managing to capture the rawness of their previous material.

The band toured in support of Black Earth Tiger alongside bands such as The Receiving End Of Sirens, Hopesfall, Envy on the Coast, Boys Night Out and I Am The Avalanche.

The tour for Black Earth Tiger was notably shorter than the Soundtrack to a Headrush tour. The band only toured the US a handful of times, and to the UK only once. After these tours, the band denied the rumors circulating that they were breaking up via a Myspace bulletin.

After the release of Black Earth Tiger, Emanuel was plagued with many problems. These ranged from debt and lack of promotion for Black Earth Tiger to personal issues. Despite this, after the Black Earth Tiger tour ended, Breen stated that he was "writing a lot" for a future Emanuel release. It was also mentioned in a Myspace blog that the band had their tour banner and equipment set up in a basement, and that they rehearsed on occasion. The band was generally assumed by fans to be on indefinite break. The band did not perform any official final shows.

Breen was originally going to be the singer for Brian Deneeve's (former guitarist of From Autumn To Ashes) new project called Summer Law, but the project made no progress until they reformed the line-up in 2010 with an entirely different group of musicians.

It is rumored that Breen and Devin Triplett are working on a new musical project. The other members of the band have gone on to form the psychedelic-rock band Good Girl, which then became inactive after a handful of shows during the summer of 2011. There are no rumored plans for either group. The band's website, Thisisemanuel.com, has been long-since shut down.

The band is also well known for a side-project, a bombastic hip-hip group by the name of 812 Dirty Squad. The Dirty Squad has released many well-received mixtapes and has gone on to achieve legendary status in the Louisville and Indiana underground rap scene. Featuring guest artists: Knife (Kasey Cull) Doc Money (Derek Allen aka DJA) Hayz (James Masterson).

In November 2025, it was revealed Devin Triplett had formed a new band called DMND Souls with ex-Uh Huh Baby Yeah singer Kevin Fletcher and drummer Sean Smith.

== Relation with PETA ==
The band has done interviews with PETA in the past. They have talked about their support of PETA's causes, most notably the ceasing of testing products on animals, as well as killing animals for clothes.

== TV appearances ==
The band did an interview for ManiaTV!, as "artist of the day" and another one for TasteItTv during the Warped Tour in 2006. The band were also guest hosts on Steven's Untitled Rock Show on FUSE TV after the release of Soundtrack to a Headrush.

== Past members ==
- Matt Breen – lead vocals, rhythm guitar
- Mat Barber – lead guitar, backing vocals
- Devin Triplett – rhythm guitar, backing vocals (2005–2008)
- Bryan Whiteman – bass guitar
- Anthony Brock – drums, percussion

== Discography ==
=== Studio albums ===
- Soundtrack to a Headrush (2005)
- Black Earth Tiger (2007)

=== EPs ===
- Hi-Skool Trivia (1999, as Emanuel Nice)
- Lanemeyer / Emanuel Nice Split (2000 split album with Lanemeyer, as Emanuel Nice)
- Steinbach2Clarksville (Colourbone / Emanuel Nice, 2000 split album, as Emanuel Nice)
- Wait (2002, as Emanuel Nice)
- Emanuel (2004, Vagrant Records)
- Acoustic (2007)

=== Singles ===
Year	Title	Album
2005	"The Willing"	Soundtrack to a Headrush
2005	"The Hey Man"	Soundtrack to a Headrush
2006	"Make Tonight"	Soundtrack to a Headrush
2007	"Cottonmouth"	Black Earth Tiger

=== Other songs ===
- "Hey Man!" – used on the Burnout Revenge (2005), The Fast and the Furious (2006) soundtracks and in Honor: A Compilation to Beat Cancer
- "Medusa" and "Disarm" – released on the Japanese version of Soundtrack to a Headrush (2005)
- The Stooges' "Search and Destroy" (cover) – released on the original soundtrack to Tony Hawk's American Wasteland (2005)
- "Mayonaise" – released on The Killer in You: A Tribute to Smashing Pumpkins (2006)
- "Viscera" – released on the ATV Offroad Fury 4 soundtrack (2006)
- "The Willing" used on Punk the Clock Vol 2 (2006)
- "Scenotaph (DJA Infected Remix)" – released on the Resident Evil: Extinction soundtrack (2007)
- "Anathamatics (Simlish)" featured in The Sims 2: Teen Style Stuff Soundtrack (2007)
- "Kryptonite (I'm on It)" – released on Punk Goes Crunk (2008)
- "Soundtrack to a Headrush" featured on alternative times, vol. 60
- "Breathe Underwater" (acoustic) released online
- "2012" 1 of 3 unreleased, demoed B-sides from the Black Earth Tiger sessions
