= Soundtrack to a Headrush =

Studio album by Emanuel
- Released: March 1, 2005
- Recorded: The Machine Shop (Hoboken, New Jersey), IIWII Studios (Hoboken, New Jersey)
- Genre: Emo
- Length: 33:29
- Label: Vagrant Records
- Producer: Machine

Emanuel chronology
Wait (2002)	Soundtrack to a Headrush (2005)	Black Earth Tiger (2007)

Singles from Soundtrack to a Headrush
- 1. "The Willing" Released: 2005; 2. "Hey Man!" Released: 2005; 3. "Make Tonight" Released: 2006

Professional ratings
Review scores
Source	Rating
Allmusic	3/5 stars
Rolling Stone	3/5 stars
Punknews	2/5 stars
Punknews	4/5 stars

Soundtrack to a Headrush is the first studio album by the band Emanuel. It was released on March 1, 2005 by Vagrant Records. The album had two singles, "The Willing" and "Make Tonight". Both videos were in active rotation on many music video channels.

== Reception ==
Punk News editor Brian Shulz compared the sound of the album to "like a cross between a poor man's Bronx and a rich man's Senses Fail" and stating the album was "Plagued by mediocrity via a mildly awkward hybrid of the abovegiven sounds.. [the album is] well-produced and musically competent but sparse in staying power." Hein Terweduwe of Punk News was more positive in his review, stating the album used "good elements of different genres to meld it into something that is quite new and different like anything I've listened to". Allmusic reviewer Stewart Mason described the album as generic, calling it "straight by-the-numbers emo-punk-pop" and criticizing it for its familiarity.

== Track listing ==
All tracks are written by Matt Breen.

No.	Title	Length
1.	"Hey Man!"	3:48
2.	"Buy American Machines"	2:13
3.	"The Willing"	3:31
4.	"Make Tonight"	3:44
5.	"Hotline"	3:26
6.	"Soundtrack to a Headrush"	2:53
7.	"Breathe Underwater"	3:33
8.	"The New Violence"	3:26
9.	"Xeroxicide"	3:18
10.	"Dislocated"	3:30

Japanese Bonus Tracks
No.	Title	Length
11.	"Medussa" (B-side)
12.	"Disarm" (The Smashing Pumpkins)

== Personnel ==
- Mat Barber – lead guitar, backing vocals
- Anthony Brock – drums
- Matt Breen – vocals, rhythm guitar
- Bryan Whiteman – bass guitar
