= Lanemeyer / Emanuel Nice =

Lanemeyer / Emanuel Nice Split

EP by Lanemeyer / Emanuel Nice
- Released: 2000
- Genre: Rock, indie rock, punk rock

Lanemeyer / Emanuel Nice chronology
Hi-Skool Trivia (1998)	Lanemeyer / Emanuel Nice Split (2000)	Steinbach2Clarksville (2000)

Lanemeyer/Emanuel Nice Split is a split single released by the bands Lanemeyer and Emanuel Nice in 2000. Only 500 copies were ever made of this split.

== Track listing ==
Lanemeyer
No.	Title	Length
1.	"Grovers Corner, New Jersey"
2.	"Thursday"

Emanuel Nice
No.	Title	Length
3.	"Kill Lincoln"
4.	"Don't Say OK"
