= Sleepwalkers (Brian Fallon album) =

Studio album by Brian Fallon
- Released: February 9, 2018
- Recorded: August 2017
- Studios: The Parlor Recording Studio, New Orleans
- Genre: Rock
- Length: 50:46
- Label: Island
- Producer: Ted Hutt

Brian Fallon chronology
Georgia (2016)	Sleepwalkers (2018)	Local Honey (2020)

Singles from Sleepwalkers
- 1. "Forget Me Not" Released: October 27, 2017; 2. "If Your Prayers Don't Get to Heaven" Released: December 15, 2017; 3. "See You on the Other Side" Released: January 12, 2018; 4. "My Name Is the Night (Color Me Black)" Released: January 26, 2018

Sleepwalkers is the second solo album by Brian Fallon, singer/guitarist of American rock band the Gaslight Anthem. It was released on February 9, 2018, through Island Records. The album peaked at #42 on the Billboard 200 chart and received "generally favorable reviews" from critics.

== Background ==
"Sleepwalkers" is notably closer to the Rock and roll sound of the Gaslight Anthem than his previous folk-influenced solo album "Painkillers." In an interview with RollingStone, Fallon said “even though it’s not necessarily [a Gaslight Anthem album], one-fourth of the band’s sound is always whatever I brought to the table. That’s mine, in anything that I do. It’d be like saying, ‘OK, I’m not going to use my left arm,'” says Fallon. “I’m just going to embrace everything I do and not hold anything back, because I like this sound.”

== Reception ==
Sleepwalkers received generally positive reviews from music critics. At Metacritic, which assigns a normalised rating out of 100 to reviews from mainstream publications, the album received an average score of 69, based on 11 professional reviews, indicating "generally favorable reviews". In a positive review Paste Magazine observed that "Fallon has a knack for crafting sturdy tunes that border on anthemic, and every chorus has fist-pumping potential."

Professional ratings
Aggregate scores
Source	Rating
Metacritic	69/100
Review scores
Source	Rating
AllMusic	3.5/5 stars
NME	3/5 stars
Paste	7.3/10

== Track listing ==
All tracks are written by Brian Fallon, except where noted.

No.	Title	Writer(s)	Length
1.	"If Your Prayers Don't Get to Heaven"		4:10
2.	"Forget Me Not"		3:48
3.	"Come Wander with Me"		3:57
4.	"Etta James"		4:49
5.	"Her Majesty's Service"	Brian Fallon; Ted Hutt	4:20
6.	"Proof of Life"		3:47
7.	"Little Nightmares"		4:34
8.	"Sleepwalkers"		3:46
9.	"My Name Is the Night (Color Me Black)"		3:49
10.	"Neptune"		5:21
11.	"Watson"		4:21
12.	"See You on the Other Side"		4:04
Total length:			50:46

== Personnel ==
Credits adapted from the physical album liner notes.

Musicians

- Brian Fallon – Guitar, keyboards, piano, vocals, backing vocals
- Ian Perkins – Guitar
- Nick Sailsbury – Bass
- Dave Hidalgo – Drums
- Steve Sidelnyk – additional drum/percussion programming
- Preservation Hall Jazz Band – appear on the song "Sleepwalkers"
  - Clint Maedgen – saxophone
  - Kyle Roussel – piano
  - Branden Lewis – trumpet

Technical personnel

- Ted Hutt – recording, production
- Ryan Mall – engineering
- Nick Guttmann and Gene O'Neill – recording assistance at The Parlor Recording Studio
- Ted Hutt and Ryan Mall – mixing at Kingsize Soundlabs, Eagle Rock, California
- Greg Calbi – mastering
- Joe Spix – art direction
- Ashley Pawlak and Joe Spix – design
- Matt Burnette-Lemon – package production
- Drew Gurian – photography

== Charts ==
Chart (2018)	Peak position
Austrian Albums (Ö3 Austria)	15
Belgian Albums (Ultratop Flanders)	61
Canadian Albums (Billboard)	55
Dutch Albums (Album Top 100)	130
German Albums (Offizielle Top 100)	6
Scottish Albums (Official Charts)	7
Swiss Albums (Schweizer Hitparade)	32
UK Albums (Official Charts)	15
US Billboard 200	42
US Americana/Folk Albums (Billboard)	4
US Top Alternative Albums (Billboard)	3
US Top Rock Albums (Billboard)	3

== Release history ==
Region	Date	Format(s)	Label
Various	February 9, 2018	Stream, vinyl, download, CD	Island
