= Local Honey =

Studio album by Brian Fallon
- Released: March 27, 2020
- Recorded: 2019
- Length: 31:16
- Label: Lesser Known Records
- Producer: Peter Katis

Brian Fallon chronology
Sleepwalkers (2018)	Local Honey (2020)	Night Divine (2021)

Singles from Local Honey
- 1. "You Have Stolen My Heart" Released: December 9, 2019; 2. "21 Days" Released: January 17, 2020; 3. "When You're Ready" Released: March 27, 2020

Local Honey is the third studio album by Brian Fallon, singer/guitarist of American rock band The Gaslight Anthem, released on March 27, 2020, through Lesser Known Records.

== Singles ==
"You Have Stolen My Heart" was released as the lead single from the album on December 9, 2019. "21 Days" was released as the second single from the album on January 17, 2020. "When You're Ready" was released as the third single from the album on March 27, 2020.

== Background ==
Talking about the album, Fallon said, "Every single song is about right now. There’s nothing on this record that has to do with the past or even the future, it just has to do with the moments that are presented and things that I’ve learned and I’m finding in my day to day. This record is 100 percent about the day today. It’s not about these glorious dreams or miserable failures, it’s just about life and how I see it."

== Critical reception ==
Professional ratings
Aggregate scores
Source	Rating
Metacritic	77/100
Review scores
Source	Rating
AllMusic	3.5/5 stars
American Songwriter	4.5/5 stars
Exclaim!	8/10
Kerrang!	4/5 stars

Local Honey received generally positive reviews from music critics. At Metacritic, which assigns a normalised rating out of 100 to reviews from mainstream publications, the album received an average score of 77, based on nine reviews, indicating "generally favorable reviews".

AllMusic's James Christopher Monger reviewed the album positively, stating, "Local Honey is an inside record that's better-suited for humid mornings and overcast afternoons than the open highway. In looking stridently inward, Fallon has crafted his most homespun and relatable outing to date." Kerrang!'s James Hickie reviewed the album positively, stating, "At just eight tracks long, Local Honey doesn’t stick around nearly long enough. That’s certainly not a charge you’d level against a release you don’t enjoy, which Brian is still yet to make. As well as being excellent, Local Honey is evidence that the man himself is able to adjust his songwriting to his circumstances without compromising in its quality. It all makes for a seriously sweet listen that reaffirms the Jersey boy as a storyteller and songwriter par excellence."

== Track listing ==
Local Honey track listing
No.	Title	Length
1.	"When You're Ready"	4:32
2.	"21 Days"	3:32
3.	"Vincent"	4:18
4.	"I Don't Mind (If I'm with You)"	3:49
5.	"Lonely for You Only"	3:36
6.	"Horses"	3:33
7.	"Hard Feelings"	4:11
8.	"You Have Stolen My Heart"	3:45
Total length:		31:16

== Personnel ==
Credits adapted from AllMusic.

- Brian Fallon – composer, guitars, piano, primary artist, vocals

Musicians

- Thomas Bartlett – keyboards, piano
- Chris Farren – keyboards, vocals
- Kori Gardner – background vocals
- Peter Katis – keyboards
- Kurt Leon – drums, guitars, percussion
- Ian Perkins – bass, guitars
- Eric Sanderson – bass
- Ian Tait – bass, upright bass

Technical personnel

- Kelsey Hunter Ayres – art direction, photography
- Thomas Bartlett – programming
- Greg Calbi – mastering
- Chris Farren – programming
- Greg Giorgio – engineer
- Laurens Grossen – assistant
- Chance Halter – assistant
- Peter Katis – engineer, mixing, producer, programming
- Kurt Leon – engineer
- Eric Sanderson – programming
- Johannes Weinberger – design, layout

== Charts ==
Sales chart performance for Local Honey
Chart (2020)	Peak position
Austrian Albums (Ö3 Austria)	48
Belgian Albums (Ultratop Flanders)	74
German Albums (Offizielle Top 100)	16
Scottish Albums (OCC)	4
Swiss Albums (Schweizer Hitparade)	67
UK Albums (OCC)	32
US Billboard 200	150

== Release history ==
Release formats for Local Honey
Region	Date	Format(s)	Label
Various	March 27, 2020	Digital download; CD; streaming	Lesser Known Records

== See also ==
- List of 2020 albums
