= Royal Bliss =

American rock band

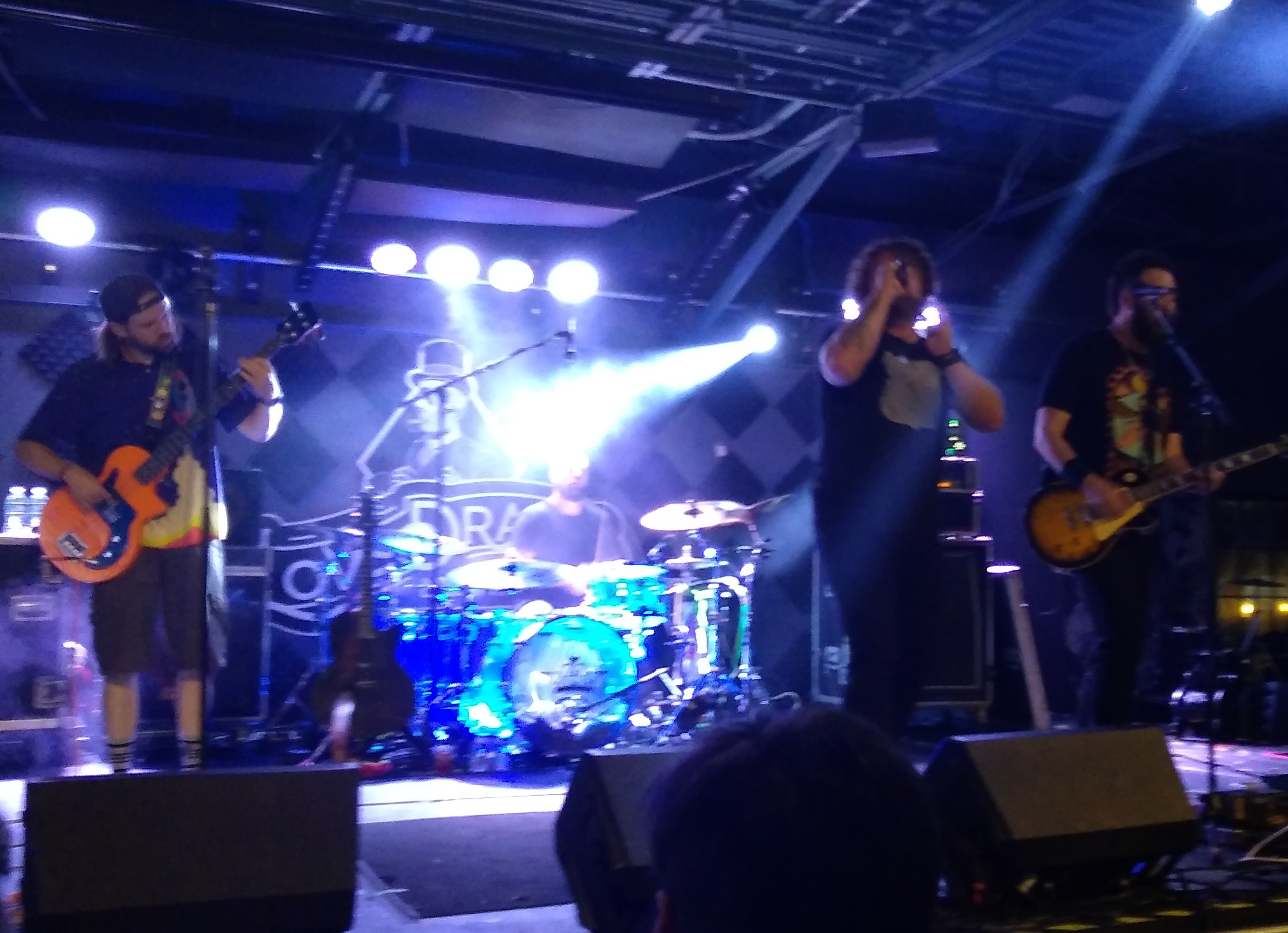
- Royal Bliss performing in Mechanicsburg, PA, July 2023

Background information
- Origin: Salt Lake City, Utah, United States
- Genres: Hard rock, post-grunge, southern rock, country rock
- Years active: 1997–present
- Labels: Air Castle Records, Merovingian, Caroline, Capitol
- Members: Neal Middleton; Taylor Richards; Jake Smith; Brian Hennesy
- Website: royalbliss.com

Royal Bliss is an American rock band from Salt Lake City, Utah. Their most recent album Blood, Wood & Steel was released in 2024.

== History ==
Royal Bliss was formed in 1997 in Salt Lake City, Utah when guitarist Chris Harding met singer Neal Middleton at one of the latter's local solo performances. They were both high school students at the time. The two then recruited additional guitarist Taylor Richards, drummer Jake Smith, and bassist Tommy Gunn. After releasing two EPs, the band released their first full-length album King Size in 2001. The band has attracted media attention for its bad luck. Smith was in a serious car accident in 2003. In 2004, Middleton was severely injured in a fall from a balcony and was temporarily paralyzed, needing a lengthy rehabilitation period.

The album After the Chaos was released in 2005, and repackaged with additional tracks as After the Chaos II the following year. That album attracted the attention of Capitol Records, which signed Royal Bliss to the Caroline Records subsidiary. The band's first album with the label, Life In-Between, reached the U.S. rock chart in 2009. Middleton competed on The Voice in 2012 but was eliminated by the judges.

The band self-released the albums Waiting Out the Storm in 2012 and Chasing the Sun in 2014. The latter was funded by a Kickstarter campaign. Their 2016 album The Truth reached some American country music charts. Harding and Gunn departed during this period, and the band used some temporary bassists and additional musicians, with the fourth position in the band stabilizing with bassist Brian Hennesy in 2017. This lineup released the album Survival in 2023, followed by the all-acoustic album Blood, Wood & Steel in 2024.

== Band members ==
=== Current ===
- Neal Middleton — lead vocals, guitar (1999–present)
- Taylor Richards — guitar, backing vocals (1998–present)
- Jake Smith — drums, backing vocals (1998–present)
- Brian Hennesy - bass, backing vocals (2017–present)

== Discography ==
=== Studio albums ===
- King Size (2001)
- After the Chaos (2005)
- After the Chaos II (2006)
- Life In-Between (2009)
- Waiting Out the Storm (2012)
- Chasing The Sun (2014)
- The Truth (2016)
- Royal Bliss (2019)
- Survival (2023)
- Blood, Wood & Steel (2024)

=== EPs ===
- 2009: Live and Acoustic in Studio A (2009)
- 2009: I Just Want You (For Christmas) (2009)

=== Compilations ===
- Free Again (1998)
- Gimmie a Little Bliss (1999)
- Old’s Cool (2001)
- 15 Years: 1997-2012 (2012)

Year	Album Title	Chart peak positions				
Year	Album Title	U.S. Billboard 200	U.S. Comprehensive Albums	U.S. Top Heatseekers	U.S. Tastemakers	U.S. Top Heatseekers (mountain)
2009	Life In-Between	151	184	4	2	1

=== Singles ===
Year	Title	Chart peak positions		Album
Year	Title	^{U.S. Main.}	^{U.S. Alt.}	Album
2008	"Save Me"	25	—	Life In-Between
2008	"I Was Drunk"	—	—	Life In-Between
2009	"We Did Nothing Wrong"	28	—	Life In-Between
2011	"I Got This"	—	—	Waiting Out the Storm
2011	"Crazy"	—	—	Waiting Out the Storm
2012	"With a Smile"	—	—	Waiting Out the Storm
2013	"Cry Sister"	31	—	Chasing the Sun
2014	"Turn Me On"	—	—	Chasing the Sun
2018	"Devil with Angel Eyes"	—	—	Royal Bliss
2018	"Hard & Loud"	—	—	Royal Bliss
2019	"Pain"	29	—	Royal Bliss
2019	"Paranoid"	21	—	Royal Bliss
2020	"Medication" (feat. Shim)	17	—	Survival
2022	"Black Rhino"	24	—	Survival
2023	"Full Moon Rising"	—	—	Survival
2023	"Through Hell" (with Citizen Soldier)	—	—	Non-album singles
2025	"By My Side"	—	—	Non-album singles

=== Music videos ===
Year	Title	Director(s)
2007	"Fine Wine"	Christopher Harding
2008	"Save Me"	Eli Presser & Greg Edgerton
2012	"Crazy"	Chris Le
2014	"Cry Sister"	Chris Le
2014	"Home"	
2014	"Turn Me On"	Aj Satterfield
2015	"It Haunts Me"	Ty Colman & John Seamons
2015	"Drown With Me"	
2016	"We're All Livin' The Dream"	Patrick Tohill
2018	"All for Me Grog"	Aj Satterfield
2018	"Devil With Angel Eyes"	Aj Satterfield
2018	"Hard and Loud"	
2019	"Pain"	Aj Satterfield
2019	"Paranoid"	
2020	"Feeling Whitney"	
2020	"SWIMU"	
2020	"Medication" (feat. Shim)	Robyn August
2020	"Favorite Things"	Los Hermanos Hennesy
2021	"Fire Within"	
2021	"Lead The Way"	Robyn August
2022	"Goodbye Love Song"	
2022	"Black Rhino"	
2023	"Chasing Stars"	Lucas Millhouse
2023	"I Was Drunk"	
2025	"By My Side"	Austin Heath
