= Runner Runner (band) =

American pop rock band

- Origin: Huntington Beach, California
- Genres: Pop rock, power pop
- Years active: 2008–2012
- Labels: Capitol, Merovingian, C.E.
- Spinoff of: Over It, Don’t Look Down, Rufio
- Members: Ryan Ogren – vocals Peter Munters – guitar, keyboards Nick Bailey – guitar Jon Berry – bass James Ulrich – drums

Runner Runner is an American pop rock band founded in Huntington Beach, California in 2008. They were the first band signed to a joint venture between Capitol Records, Merovingian Music and C.E. Music, a subsidiary of David Letterman's Worldwide Pants, Inc.

== History ==
Runner Runner was founded in Huntington Beach, California by its current members, Ryan Ogren, Peter Munters, Jon Berry, Nick Bailey, and James Ulrich. The five friends came together after their previous projects, Over It, Rufio and Don't Look Down, had dissolved. Their name originated from Ryan Ogren and Jon Berry's love of poker. The term "runner runner" is poker slang, used when a player makes a hand with both the turn and river cards.

The band posted "Dedicate" on their Myspace profile in May 2008, followed by "The Break Up Song" a month later. A music video was released for "Dedicate" in October 2008. They first started touring in 2009, opening for Owl City and headliner Relient K. They performed at The Bamboozle festival and appeared on the 2009 Warped Tour. In April 2010, it was announced that the band had signed to EMI Group, and would release their debut album through the imprint Capitol Records later in the year. On May 5, 2010, "So Obvious" was posted online; a music video was released for it on June 15, 2010. They began touring with Secondhand Serenade and The White Tie Affair in June 2010. In August, they began their first headlining tour, and closed out the year touring briefly with 2AM Club, and then with Forever The Sickest Kids. Their national television debut was on Jimmy Kimmel Live! on July 20, 2010. They were also featured on the Late Show with David Letterman on September 27, 2010.

Runner Runner's debut single, "So Obvious", received moderate radio airplay. The band's second single to go to radio was "Hey Alli" and was a free download as part of iTunes "Single of the Week" program. Two music videos were released for this single. The first featured the band in an intimate studio setting with a raw acoustic performance. The second video didn't feature the band but rather focused on the story behind the song and its lyrical content.

On February 15, 2011 Runner Runner released their self-titled debut album. To educate their fans and the public on the music industry, an open letter titled "A Call to Arms" was posted on Runner Runner's official website and various social profiles.

In June 2011, Runner Runner started a U.S. tour opening for co-headliners Yellowcard and Good Charlotte.

== Discography ==
=== Studio albums ===
Title	Details	Peak chart positions	
Title	Details	US	US Heat
Runner Runner	Release date: February 15, 2011; Label: Capitol Records; Formats: CD, music download	185	3

=== Extended plays ===
- Your Greatest Hits (July 2007)
- Breakup Makeup (September 2008)
- Stripped (September 2008)
- The Summer (July 2009)
- Under The Covers (December 2009)
- Acoustic Acoustic (October 2010)

=== Singles ===
Year	Single	Peak positions	Album
Year	Single	US Pop	Album
2010	"So Obvious"	32	Runner Runner
2010	"Unstoppable"	—	Runner Runner
2010	"Hey Alli"	—	Runner Runner
"—" denotes releases that did not chart

== Other releases ==
List of songs that were not released as singles, showing year released and album name
Song	Year	Album
"She Will Be Loved" (originally performed by Maroon 5)	2009	Rockin' Romance
