= Reinventing a Lost Art =

Studio album by Tokyo Rose
- Released: July 1, 2003
- Genres: Pop punk; emo pop
- Length: 49.7 Minutes
- Label: Sidecho

Tokyo Rose chronology
Chasing Fireflies EP	Reinventing a Lost Art (2003)	New American Saint (2005)

Reinventing a Lost Art is the debut album by New Jersey–based indie, pop-punk group, Tokyo Rose. This album was the only that featured Greg Doran on guitar, as he, soon after the release, left the band to become a guitar teacher in his hometown. Since the record's release, two more albums have been recorded, and fared better than the previous: New American Saint and 2007's The Promise in Compromise.

== Reception ==
Professional ratings
Review scores
Source	Rating
Allmusic	3/5 stars
Punknews	}
ThePunkSite	(favorable)

Allmusic reviewed the record as "misleading", yet "admirable" at the same time. Katie of Punknews said that although that there were hints of originality, the record wasn't any much different from other popular pop punk acts.

== Track listing ==
1. Saturday, Everyday (3:23)
2. Don't Look Back (3:21)
3. Right Through Your Teeth (3:36)
4. Word Of Mouth (2:40)
5. Take The Wheel (3:35)
6. Weapon Of Choice (3:32)
7. You Ruined Everything (4:21)
8. Phonecords and Postcards (2:52)
9. Katherine Please (4:42)
10. Before You Burn (4:13)
