= Georgia (EP) =

EP by Brian Fallon
- Released: April 16, 2016
- Length: 11:27
- Label: Island

Brian Fallon chronology
Painkillers (2016)	Georgia (2016)	Sleepwalkers (2018)

Georgia is a three-song EP by Brian Fallon, singer/guitarist of American rock band The Gaslight Anthem, released on April 16, 2016, through Island Records. It is a Record Store Day 2016 exclusive, limited to 2,000 pressings on 10" vinyl.

== Track listing ==
All tracks are written by Brian Fallon

No.	Title	Length
1.	"Tin Pan Alley"	3:25
2.	"Low Love"	3:53
3.	"Georgia"	4:09
Total length:		11:27

== Release history ==
Source: Record Store Day's official website

Region	Date	Format(s)	Label
United States	April 16, 2016	vinyl	Island
