= Babylon A.D. (album) =

Studio album by Babylon A.D.
- Released: September 1989
- Recorded: Ocean Way Studios, Cherokee Studios and Summa Recorders, Los Angeles; TMF Stusios, New York City; Rumbo Recorders, Canoga Park, California
- Genre: Glam metal
- Length: 44:56
- Label: Arista
- Producer: Simon Hanhart

Babylon A.D. chronology
Babylon A.D. (1989)	Nothing Sacred (1992)

Singles from Babylon A.D.
- 1. "Bang Go the Bells" Released: 1989; 2. "Hammer Swings Down" Released: 1989; 3. "The Kid Goes Wild" Released: 1990; 4. "Desperate" Released: 1990

Professional ratings
Review scores
Source	Rating
Allmusic	4/5 stars

Babylon A.D. is the debut album by the American hard rock band of the same name, released in 1989. It contains the metal hits "Bang Go The Bells", "Hammer Swings Down" and "The Kid Goes Wild" which was also featured in the film RoboCop 2.

== Music Videos ==
In the music video for "The Kid Goes Wild", RoboCop attends a performance of Babylon A.D. and targets the kid who appears in the movie for arrest. Interestingly, just two years later in 1991, the music video for the Guns N' Roses song "You Could Be Mine" featured the Terminator attending a performance of Guns N' Roses and targeting them for termination.

== Track listing ==
Track listing for Babylon A.D.
No.	Title	Songwriter(s)	Length
1.	"Bang Go the Bells"	Derek Davis, Ron Freschi, Robb Reid	4:15
2.	"Hammer Swings Down"	Davis, Jack Ponti	3:27
3.	"Caught Up in the Crossfire"	Davis, Ponti	3:33
4.	"Desperate"	Davis, Ponti	5:23
5.	"The Kid Goes Wild"	Davis, Ponti, Vic Pepe	4:52
6.	"Shot o' Love"	Davis	5:47
7.	"Maryanne"	Davis, Ponti	3:41
8.	"Back in Babylon"	Davis, John Matthews, Jamey Pacheco	4:10
9.	"Sweet Temptation"	Davis, Freschi	3:40
10.	"Sally Danced"	Davis	5:53
Total length:			44:56

== Personnel ==
Band members

- Derek Davis - vocals, acoustic guitar
- Dan De La Rosa - guitars
- Ron Freschi - guitars, backing vocals
- Robb Reid - bass, backing vocals
- Jamey Pacheco - drums

Additional musicians

- John Matthews - guitars
- Jimmy Wood - harmonica
- Sam Kinison - vocals on "The Kid Goes Wild"

Production

- Simon Hanhart - producer, engineer, mixing
- Clark Germain, Eric Rudd, Julie Last, Scott Ralston, Guy Snider, Thom Roberts, Micajah Ryan, Chris Fuhrman - assistant engineers
- Chris Bellman - mastering
- Hugh Syme - art direction
- John Scarpati - photography

== Charts ==
Chart (1989)	Peak position
US Billboard 200	88
