= Brian Fallon =

American musician (born 1980)

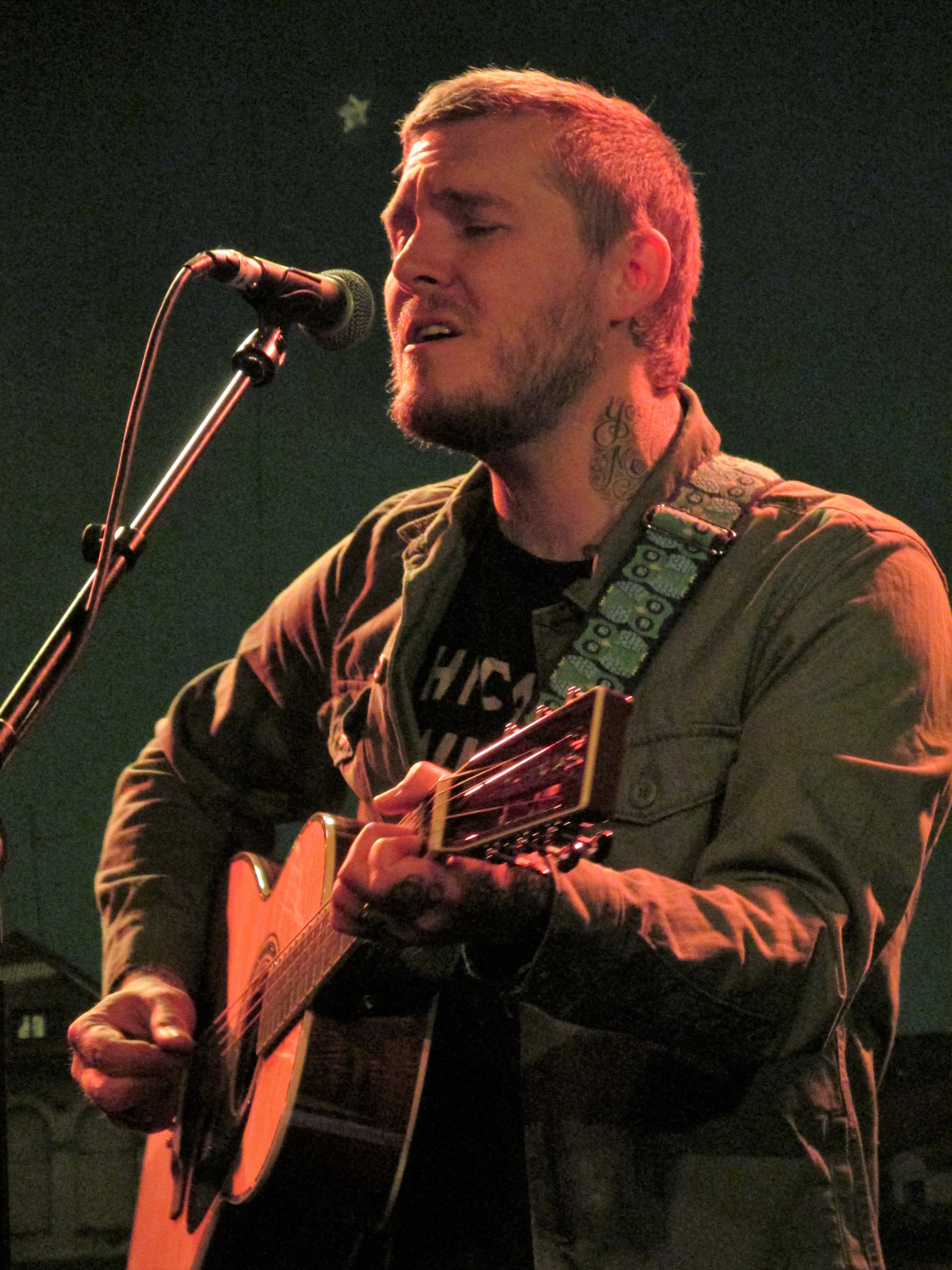
- Fallon performing in Cambridge, England, in 2019

Background information
- Born: Brian Michael Fallon; January 28, 1980 (age 46); Red Bank, New Jersey, U.S.
- Origin: New Brunswick, New Jersey, U.S.
- Genres: Rock; punk rock; heartland rock; folk rock
- Occupations: Musician; singer; songwriter
- Instruments: Vocals; guitar; harmonica; piano
- Years active: 1997–present
- Labels: Mercury; SideOneDummy; XOXO; Sabot Productions; Resist
- Member of: The Gaslight Anthem
- Formerly of: The Horrible Crowes; Molly and the Zombies; This Charming Man; Surrogate McKenzie; Amping Copper; Brian Fallon & Cincinnati Rail Tie; No Release

Brian Michael Fallon (born January 28, 1980) is an American musician, singer and songwriter. He is best known as the lead vocalist, rhythm guitarist, and main lyricist of the rock band the Gaslight Anthem, with whom he has recorded six studio albums. He was also a member of the duo the Horrible Crowes, alongside the Gaslight Anthem's guitar technician and touring guitarist Ian Perkins. Since 2016, Fallon has released five solo albums and one EP.

== Biography ==
Fallon was born in Red Bank, New Jersey, in 1980. His mother Debbie was in a folk band in the late 1960s called "The Group Folk Singers". Fallon spent his teen years in Hackettstown, New Jersey, where he became close friends with Tom "Tommy Gunn" DuHamel of the band Communication Redlight. Fallon attended Hackettstown High School.

When Fallon was 17, he released a cassette under the stage name "No Release". He also once wanted to start a small record label to be called "Old 45 Records".

== Band affiliations and projects ==
=== No Release (1997) ===
At the age of 17, Fallon released a cassette titled The Coffeehouse Sessions under the name No Release. It was released under Mean Little Man Productions. There are only about 200 copies of the limited release demo. There are 16 tracks on the demo which featured Chris Eissing as lead guitar on a few tracks.

=== Amping Copper (2001) ===
With the band Amping Copper, which has been called "basically...Surrogate McKenzie version 2", Fallon was involved with the recording of the 6-track self-titled CD, Amping Copper, in 2001.

=== Brian Fallon – Cincinnati Rail Tie (2004) ===
After Amping Copper, Fallon wanted to record a solo EP while maintaining the band feel. He asked a friend, Casey Lee Morgan, from the band Lanemeyer to play drums. Another friend, Mike Hemberger, played bass and produced the EP. One of Fallon's old guitar teachers, Tim Fogarty, played guitar on two tracks. Together they recorded The American Music EP in 2004, which featured Fallon's mother on backing vocals.

=== This Charming Man (2004–2005) ===
In 2004, Fallon, along with Michael Volpe, Chris Clementi and Mike Leboeuf, founded This Charming Man. Fallon and Volpe remained the only original members when Benny Horowitz and Alex Levine joined in late 2005. In early 2006, Volpe decided to leave the band and Alex Rosamilia was brought on board, thus bringing together the future line-up of the Gaslight Anthem.

This Charming Man's only full release was Every Little Secret in 2005, with the original lineup. Another song by the original band called "She Coulda Raised the Titanic" later became "1930" on the Gaslight Anthem's album, Sink or Swim.

=== The Gaslight Anthem (2006–2015, 2018, 2022–present) ===
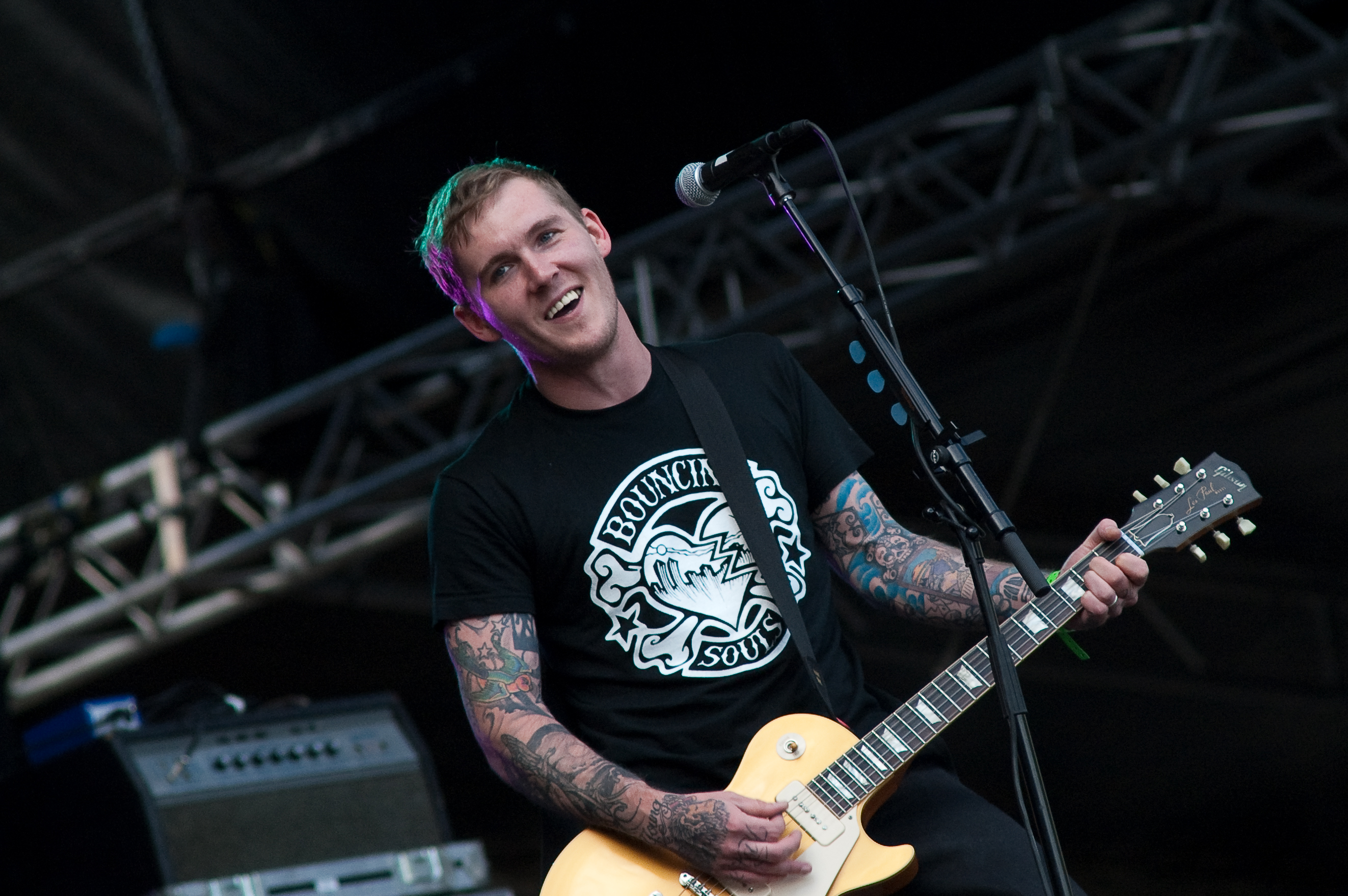
Brian performing on stage in 2009.

Fallon has been the prominent song writer and vocalist for the Gaslight Anthem since their transition from This Charming Man. With the band he has recorded six studio albums, Sink or Swim, The '59 Sound, American Slang, Handwritten, Get Hurt and History Books. In 2009, he joined Bruce Springsteen on stage for the headlining set at the Hard Rock Calling Festival, performing the song "No Surrender". On July 29, 2015, the band announced an indefinite hiatus after their European summer tour, which ended with an appearance at Reading Festival on August 30.

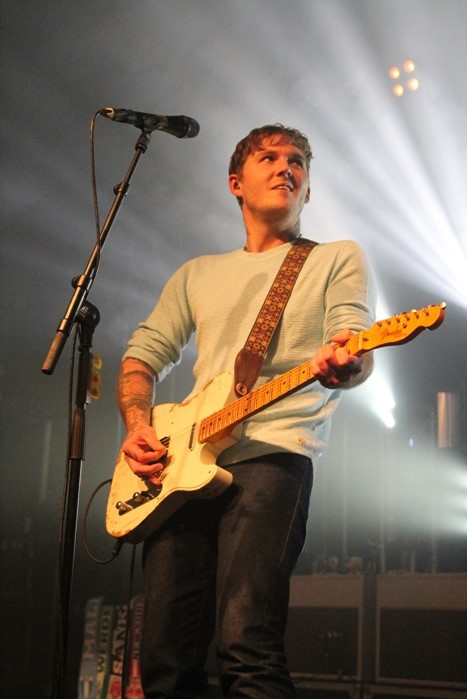
Fallon fronting the Gaslight Anthem, Stuttgart, Germany, 2014

Fallon said of the band, "People will always say, 'why are you doing a solo record?' And I'm like, 'because I don't have anything to say with Gaslight'. Those five records, that's what you got. That's the piece. I feel it's a lot like The Replacements. There's no new music because that's all Paul [Westerberg] and the band has to say. When the book is over, it's over. And I have like… four-and-a-half records I'm really proud of."

The Gaslight Anthem reunited on March 25, 2022, with Fallon posting: "I am very pleased to announce to you all that The Gaslight Anthem is returning to full time status as a band. We’ll be announcing a lot of tour dates in the next couple of days. We’re also beginning to write new songs for what will be our sixth LP. We’re very much looking forward to the future and seeing you all again. We want to thank you for staying with us. Stay tuned!"

After the band's tour throughout 2022, Fallon's first new music with the band in nine years, Positive Charge, was released on April 28, 2023, followed by the announcement of the band's first studio album in nine years, History Books, which was released later in 2023.

=== The Horrible Crowes (2011–present) ===
On January 20, 2011, Fallon announced on his blog that he had formed the group the Horrible Crowes with his guitar tech, Ian Perkins.

The first single, "Behold the Hurricane", was made available for streaming through RollingStone.com on July 13, 2011. On September 1, Rolling Stone streamed the album in its entirety. On September 20, the video for "Behold the Hurricane" was uploaded to the Horrible Crowes' website.

Their debut album, Elsie, was released on September 6, 2011, in the US.

=== Molly and the Zombies (2013–present) ===
Molly and the Zombies is an Americana/folk group that was formed in 2013 by Fallon with guitarist and Plow United frontman Brian McGee, former Ryan Adams and the Cardinals bassist Catherine Popper, and Scissor Sisters drummer Randy Schrager. The band performed their first show in December 2013 in Asbury Park, New Jersey, opening for the Bouncing Souls at the Stone Pony. According to Fallon, there is no record deal and there will be no album. He also said all of the band's music, which he wrote and didn't feel like using for the Gaslight Anthem, was inspired by Bob Dylan's Highway 61 Revisited album. The band's name comes partially from the Roky Erickson song "I Walked With a Zombie" and a 1943 horror movie.

Molly and the Zombies performed at the Bell House in Brooklyn, New York, on June 5, 2014, with Jared Hart of the Scandals and Dave Hause as opening acts. They released 5 songs for free online: "Long Drives", "Lucky", "Red Lights", "Sketchy", and "Smoke".

=== Solo career (2016–present) ===
Fallon released his first solo album, Painkillers, on March 11, 2016. He toured in support of the album with his backing band the Horrible Crowes. On April 16, 2016, Fallon released a three-song EP entitled Georgia. The EP was a Record Store Day 2016 exclusive limited to 2,000 pressings on 10" vinyl. Fallon's second album, Sleepwalkers, was released on February 9, 2018. He toured in support of this album during 2018.

Local Honey, Fallon's third album, was released on March 27, 2020. Fallon's fourth and most recent solo album, Night Divine, was released on November 5, 2021. The album consists of Fallon's recordings of classic Hymns and Christmas carols.

The song "You Have Stolen My Heart" off Local Honey was featured in the 2023 feature film Scream VI.

Fallon recorded a cover of Will You Still Love Me Tomorrow by the Shirelles with Madi Diaz that was featured on the soundtrack for the 2026 movie Ready or Not 2: Here I Come. This is the second movie where Samara Weaving has a role that Fallon had a song in, with the first being Scream VI.

On May 13, 2026, Fallon released "Not Bad for New Jersey" and "Better Before", his first new solo music in five years. Both songs were produced by Butch Walker and will be featured on his upcoming album. On June 10, 2026, Fallon announced that his fifth studio album, Not Bad for New Jersey, would be released on September 10, 2026. The album's third single, "Pearls", was released on the same date of the album announcement. The album features guest appearances by Brandon Flowers, Phil Collen and Lori McKenna along with a tribute song to Dee Dee Ramone written from the perspective of his former wife, Vera Boldis.

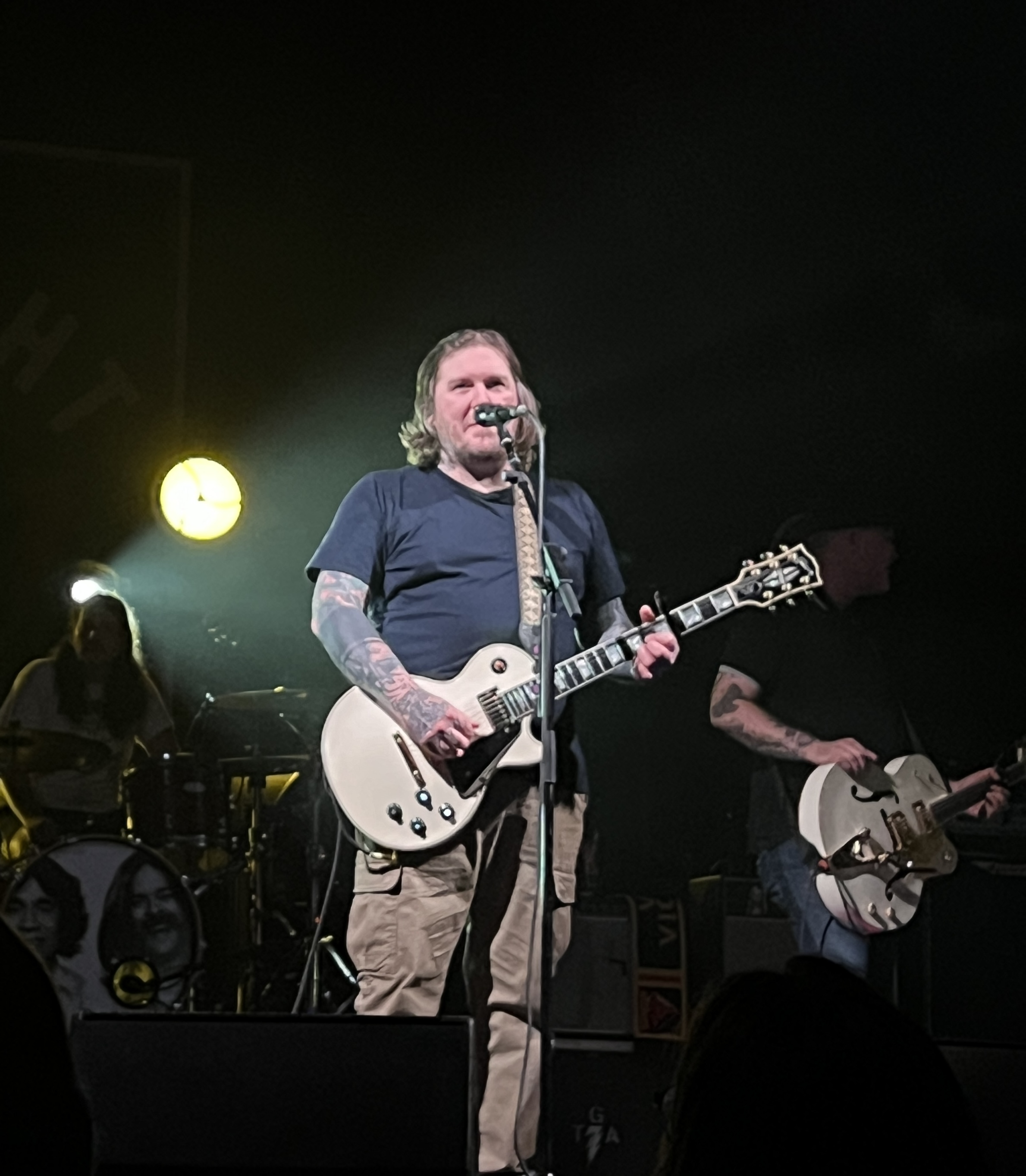
Brian Fallon, performing with the Gaslight Anthem, at the Fillmore Auditorium in Denver, Colorado (October 2, 2023)

== Personal life ==
Brian Fallon is a Christian, but he avoids using references to his faith in the Gaslight Anthem's music, although religious themes are heavily present in his solo work. As he stated in an interview with spinner.com referring to the Gaslight Anthem's 2010 album American Slang, "There are no religious songs and there never would be because the four of us, we all have different views, completely different religions...I'm very cautious not to push that on the band."

Much of the lyrics on the Gaslight Anthem's 2014 album, Get Hurt, were inspired by his divorce. Fallon said, “Sometimes, I don’t even know how it happened. I don’t even know how it got like this. All I know is that it did. And I now have to figure out: What do I do now?" Fallon has since remarried and welcomed his second child.

== Discography ==
Albums

- Painkillers (2016)
- Sleepwalkers (2018)
- Local Honey (2020)
- Night Divine (2021)
- Not Bad for New Jersey (2026)

Extended plays

- Georgia (2016)
