= Elsie (album) =

Studio album by The Horrible Crowes
- Released: September 6, 2011
- Recorded: 2011
- Genres: Blues, soul, rock
- Length: 45:49
- Label: SideOneDummy
- Producer: Ted Hutt

Singles from Elsie
- 1. "Behold the Hurricane" Released: July 19, 2011

Elsie is the debut studio album by The Horrible Crowes, a Gaslight Anthem side-project made up of Ian Perkins and Gaslight Anthem founder Brian Fallon. It was released on September 6, 2011, through SideOneDummy Records.

A 10th anniversary reissue of the album, featuring ten bonus tracks, was released on vinyl on February 11, 2022.

== Singles ==
Elsie's lead single, "Behold the Hurricane," was released July 19, 2011.

== Critical reception ==
Professional ratings
Aggregate scores
Source	Rating
Metacritic	76/100
Review scores
Source	Rating
AbsolutePunk	9.9/10
AllMusic	4/5 stars
Alternative Press	4.5/5 stars
MOJO	4/5 stars
Rolling Stone	3.5/5 stars
Spin	6/10

Elsie received mostly positive reviews from music critics. At Metacritic, the album has an average score of 76 out of 100, which indicates "generally favorable reviews" based on 15 reviews.

Andrew Leahey of AllMusic rated the album four out of five stars with this comment: "Elsie functions best as a display of Fallon’s underused bottom register and acoustic songwriting skills, proving that slowing things down once in a while can still be a punk rock move." Writing for Alternative Press, Scott Heisel writes Elsie is "better than just about everything the Gaslight Anthem have done to date. Perfect for night drives on long, winding roads."

== Track listing ==
Adapted from AllMusic

All tracks are written by Brian Fallon and Ian Perkins, except where noted.

No.	Title	Length
1.	"Last Rites"	1:27
2.	"Sugar"	4:53
3.	"Behold the Hurricane"	4:03
4.	"I Witnessed a Crime"	3:05
5.	"Go Tell Everybody"	4:17
6.	"Cherry Blossoms"	4:07
7.	"Ladykiller"	4:24
8.	"Crush"	3:19
9.	"Mary Ann"	3:35
10.	"Black Betty and the Moon"	3:00
11.	"Blood Loss"	4:03
12.	"I Believe Jesus Brought Us Together"	5:36
Total length:		45:49

10 year anniversary edition bonus tracks
No.	Title	Length
13.	"Last Rites (demo)"	1:28
14.	"Behold the Hurricane (demo)"	3:51
15.	"I Witnessed a Crime (demo)"	2:59
16.	"Go Tell Everybody (demo)"	4:03
17.	"Cherry Blossoms (demo)"	4:03
18.	"Crush (demo)"	2:38
19.	"Mary Ann (demo)"	3:21
20.	"I Believe Jesus Brought Us Together (demo)"	5:06
21.	"Teenage Dream (live)" (Katy Perry, Lukasz Gottwald, Max Martin, Benjamin Levin, Bonnie McKee; originally performed by Katy Perry)	4:52
22.	"Never Tear Us Apart" (Andrew Farriss, Michael Hutchence, originally performed by INXS)	3:34
Total length:		35:56

== Personnel ==
Credits adapted from AllMusic

=== Musicians ===
- Brian Fallon – guitar, Hammond B3, percussion, piano, vocals
- Ian Perkins – bass, guitar, slide guitar
- Hollie Fallon – Hammond B3
- Ben Horowitz – timpani
- Ted Hutt – guitar
- Adele Jensen – trumpet
- The Parkington Sisters – accordion, strings, vocals
- Alex Rosamilia – guitar
- Steve Sidelnyk – drums, percussion

=== Technical ===
- Tom Baker – mastering
- Danny Clinch – photography
- Joseph DeMaio – assistant engineer
- Ted Hutt – mixing, production
- Ryan Mall – engineer, mixing
- Steve Sidelnyk – programming

== Chart performance ==
Chart (2011)	Peak position
German Albums (Offizielle Top 100)	63
Norwegian Albums (VG-lista)	35
Scottish Albums (Official Charts)	60
UK Albums (Official Charts)	67
UK Album Downloads (Official Charts)	65
UK Independent Albums (Official Charts)	9
US Billboard 200	48
US Independent Albums (Billboard)	6
US Top Rock Albums (Billboard)	7
US Indie Store Album Sales (Billboard)	4

== Release history ==
Source: Amazon.com

Region	Date	Format(s)	Label
Worldwide	September 6, 2011	CD; digital download; vinyl	SideOneDummy
