= Machine II Machine =

Studio album by Doro
- Released: March 1995
- Recorded: Ocean Recording, Ocean Gate, New Jersey, USA; Sheffield Mobile Unit
- Genres: Hard rock, heavy metal
- Length: 67:16
- Label: Vertigo
- Producers: Jack Ponti, Greg Smith, Dennis Bourke, Kevin Shirley, Camus Celli, Andres Levin, Harold Frazee

Doro chronology
Doro Live (1993)	Machine II Machine (1995)	A Whiter Shade of Pale (1995)

Limited edition CD cover

Singles from Machine II Machine
- 1. "Ceremony / Tie Me Up" Released: 1995; 2. "In Freiheit Stirbt Mein Herz / Dirty Diamonds / You Got Me Singing" Released: 1995

Professional ratings
Review scores
Source	Rating
Metal Hammer (GER)	5/7 stars
Musikexpress (GER)	3/7 stars

Machine II Machine is the fifth studio album by the German female hard rock singer Doro Pesch. The album was released in March 1995 and mixed by Kevin Shirley and Greg Smith. It is the most mainstream oriented album of the German singer to date, thanks to the production of Jack Ponti (Bon Jovi, Alice Cooper, Baton Rouge) and the collaboration of musicians and authors coming from pop, country and even Latin music. The lyrics break new ground for Doro, as many of the songs deal with erotic themes. The last track is a remix done by members of the German industrial metal band Die Krupps, who worked with Doro on her next albums. The limited edition of the album contains the bonus track "Tie Me Up (Hard & Fast mix)".

The album peaked at position No. 33 in the German Longplay chart.

== Track listing ==
No.	Title	Writer(s)	Length
1.	"Tie Me Up"	Doro Pesch, Jack Ponti, Greg Smith	4:59
2.	"The Want"	Pesch, Ponti, Camus Celli, Andres Levin	6:30
3.	"Ceremony"	Pesch, Ponti, Celli, Levin	4:56
4.	"Machine II Machine"	Pesch, Ponti, Smith	5:01
5.	"Are They Coming for Me"	Pesch, Ponti, Elliot Easton	4:38
6.	"Can't Stop Thinking about You"	Pesch, Ponti, Celli, Levin	4:19
7.	"Don't Mistake It for Love"	Pesch, Ponti, Nick Douglas	4:22
8.	"Desperately"	Pesch, Ponti, Harold Frazee	4:58
9.	"Love Is a Thrill"	Pesch, Ponti, Smith	4:06
10.	"Light in the Window"	Pesch, Ponti, Danny Tate	4:24
11.	"Welcome to the Tribe"	Pesch, Ponti, Celli, Levin	3:25
12.	"Like Whiskey Straight"	Pesch, Ponti, Smith	4:38
13.	"In Freiheit, Stirbt Mein Herz ('In Freedom, My Heart Dies')"	Pesch, Ponti, Earl Slick	5:42
14.	"Ceremony" (Rattlesnake Bite mix by Die Krupps FX)		5:05
Total length:			67:16

Special Limited Edition
No.	Title	Length
15.	"Tie Me Up (hard & fast mix)"	5:14

== Personnel ==
Band members

- Doro Pesch – vocals
- Jack Ponti – guitars, bass, backing vocals
- Greg Smith – guitars, bass, drums, keyboards, backing vocals
- Andres Levin – guitars, bass
- Camus Celli – drums
- Harold Frazee – keyboards, backing vocals
- Nick Douglas – bass, backing vocals
- Johnny Dee – drums
- John Pfeiffer – guitars, backing vocals
- Elliot Easton – guitars, backing vocals
- Earl Slick – guitars

Production

- Nelson Ayers – engineer
- Dennis Bourke – engineer, associate producer
- Camus Celli – producer
- Harold Frazee – associate producer
- Mike Goldberg – engineer
- Ted Jensen – mastering
- Christine Kozler – assistant engineers
- Andres Levin – producer
- Garth "Gaff" Micheal – assistant engineer
- Jack Ponti – engineer, producer
- Kevin Shirley – mixing, associate producer
- Greg Smith – mixing, associate producer
- Keith Tackel – assistant engineer
- Steve Weinkam – assistant engineer

== Charts ==
Chart (1995)	Peak position
German Albums (Offizielle Top 100)	33
Swiss Albums (Schweizer Hitparade)	38
