= Supagroup =

American rock and roll band

Supagroup is an American rock and roll band from New Orleans, Louisiana. Their current lineup includes vocalist and rhythm guitarist Chris Lee, lead guitarist Benji Lee, bassist Brian "Bruiser" Broussard, and drummer Leon Touzet. Chris Lee is married to former White Zombie bassist Sean Yseult. In early 2003, the band won the New Orleans regional poll in The 2nd Annual Independent Music Awards for their song "She's Hot (I'm On A Roll)."

== Background ==
Supagroup was formed in 1996 by Chinese American brothers Chris Lee and Benji Lee from Anchorage, Alaska while students at Tulane University in New Orleans, Louisiana. They have headlined with Vince Neil of Mötley Crüe, Queens of the Stone Age, Supersuckers, Fu Manchu, Drive-By Truckers and Alice Cooper, among others. In 2004, Supagroup received a standing ovation for Alice Cooper, something Cooper claimed hasn't happened since Guns N' Roses opened his shows. The band commonly calls their followers supagroupies.

The band's first album, Planet Rock, was self-produced and self-released on their own Prison Planet label. They followed that with a live album. In 2001, Rock and Roll Tried to Ruin My Life, produced by Jack Endino, was released in a limited quantity. 2004's self-titled album was produced by Benji Lee and Trina Shoemaker. The band's 2007 album, Fire for Hire includes a number of studio versions of songs that first appeared on their We Came to Rock You live album, as well as songs influenced by the events surrounding Hurricane Katrina.

== Discography ==
=== Albums ===
- Planet Rock (1996, Prison Planet Records)
- We Came to Rock You: Live at the Mermaid Lounge (1999, Prison Planet Records)
- Rock and Roll Tried to Ruin My Life (2001, Prison Planet Records)
- Supagroup (2003, Foodchain Records)
- Rules (2005, Foodchain)
- Fire for Hire (2007, Merovingian/Foodchain)
- Hail! Hail! (2011)

=== Singles ===
- "When in Rome" 7" (2001, Telegraph Company)
- Supersuckers vs Supagroup split CD (2003)
- "What's Your Problem" promo DVD (2004)
