= Angels Never Die =

Studio album by Doro
- Released: 22 February 1993
- Studios: Ocean Recording, Ocean Gate, New Jersey, USA; Sheffield Mobile Unit
- Genres: Hard rock, heavy metal
- Length: 53:57
- Label: Vertigo
- Producers: Jack Ponti, Vic Pepe

Doro chronology
True at Heart (1991)	Angels Never Die (1993)	Doro Live (1993)

Singles from Angels Never Die
- 1. "Enough for You / You Ain't Lived (Till You're Loved to Death)" Released: 1993; 2. "Bad Blood / Children of the Night / Eye on You" Released: 1993; 3. "Last Day of My Life/ Rock Angel / Rare Diamond (live)" Released: 1993; 4. "Alles Ist Gut / Für Immer / Last Day of My Life" Released: 1993

Professional ratings
Review scores
Source	Rating
Metal Hammer (GER)	5/7 stars
Rock Realms	5/7 stars

Angels Never Die is the fourth solo album of the German female hard rock singer Doro Pesch. The album was released in February 1993 and was produced by Jack Ponti and Vic Pepe. The two producers had worked with Alice Cooper on the hit single "Hey Stoopid" and had produced minor glam metal bands like Surgin' and Baton Rouge. The sound and musical style of Angels Never Die is very similar to what can be heard on the second Doro solo album, alternating heavy rock tracks with large choruses and power ballads, in the vein of the declining glam metal that had dominated the American rock charts for the first part of the decade.

The album was not published in the US and had limited success in Europe. However, the video for the song "Bad Blood" was voted best anti-racism video during the first MTV Europe Music Awards ceremony in 1994.

Angels Never Die remained on the German Longplay chart for 13 weeks, peaking at position No. 21.

== Track listing ==
All credits adapted from the original release.

No.	Title	Writer(s)	Length
1.	"Eye on You"	Doro Pesch, Jack Ponti, Vic Pepe	3:06
2.	"Bad Blood"	Pesch, Ponti, Pepe	4:09
3.	"Last Day of My Life"	Pesch, Ponti, Pepe	5:31
4.	"Born to Bleed"	Pesch, Gary Scruggs	4:21
5.	"Cryin'"	Pesch, Ponti, Pepe, Elizabeth G. Daily	3:54
6.	"You Ain't Lived (Till You're Loved to Death)"	Pesch, Craig Wiseman	4:03
7.	"So Alone Together"	Pesch, Scruggs	5:40
8.	"All I Want"	Pesch, Ponti, Pepe	3:44
9.	"Enough for You"	Pesch, Ponti, Pepe	4:48
10.	"Heaven with You"	Pesch, Ponti, Pepe	4:50
11.	"Don't Go"	Pesch, Ponti, Pepe	5:28
12.	"Alles ist Gut" ("Everything is Good")	Pesch, Henry Staroste, Wesley Plass	3:29
Total length:			53:53

== Personnel ==
Musicians

- Doro Pesch – vocals, arrangements
- Jack Ponti – electric guitar, bass, keyboards, producer, arrangements, mixing, backing vocals
- Vic Pepe – acoustic guitar, electric guitar, producer, arrangements
- Ryan Roxie – electric guitar
- Harold Frazee – keyboards, piano, backing vocals
- Nick Douglas, Matt Nelson, Brian Perry – bass
- Joey Franco – drums, percussion

Guests

- Eric Gales – guitar solo on "Heaven with You", "Born to Bleed" and "Bad Blood"
- Eugene Gales – guitar solo on "Last Day of My Life" and "Don't Go"

Production

- Jon Mathias – engineer, mixing
- Garth Micheal, Barry Steiman – assistant engineers
- George Marino – mastering

== Charts ==
Chart (1993)	Peak position
German Albums (Offizielle Top 100)	21
Swiss Albums (Schweizer Hitparade)	31
