= Tokyo Rose (band) =

American indie rock band

- Origin: New Brunswick, New Jersey, United States
- Genres: Emo, pop punk, power pop, emo-pop, pop rock
- Years active: 1999-present
- Labels: SideCho Records, All About Records
- Members: Ryan Dominguez (Vocals/Guitar); Matt Fleischman (Lead Guitar); Shawn Fichtner (Drums); Chris Poulsen (bass)
- Past members: Mike Glita (Drums)

Tokyo Rose is an indie rock band from New Brunswick, New Jersey. As of 2007 they have released 3 studio albums, and a short demo EP, whilst extensively changing their lineup over their 7 years of activity.

== History ==
Tokyo Rose was formed in 1999 by Mike Glita, former bassist of Senses Fail, and Matt Reilly, formerly of The Finals. Soon after going through several line up changes, Ryan Dominguez became the new singer/frontman of the band. This marked the fruition of what eventually became what Tokyo Rose is today. In the summer of 2001, Reilly parted ways with the band, while Glita, the drummer of Tokyo Rose at the time, and Ryan Dominguez (vocals, guitar) enlisted Chris Poulsen (bass), formerly of Professor Plum, and headed into the studio to record their debut EP "Chasing Fireflies." The EP was released on a label based out of Boston called All About Records, and later received distribution through The Militia Group. Later in 2002, Mike Glita parted ways with the band. After a couple of lineup changes, they secured Jake Margolis (drums) and Greg Doran (guitar) to complete the band.

After signing to SideCho Records, the band spent Spring of 2003 at Portrait Studios in Lincoln Park, New Jersey recording Reinventing a Lost Art, Tokyo Rose's debut full-length album. It was produced by Jersey-based producer Chris Badami (The Dillinger Escape Plan, The Early November, The Starting Line) and was released July 15, 2003. They released their second album New American Saint, featuring Fred Mascherino of Taking Back Sunday on the track "A Reason to Come Home Again." Tom Roslak (Drummer and Berklee Student) bows out of lineup to finish his degree at Berklee. Discussion with Tom reveals sadness at not touring with the Band, but he decides to perform while group looks for a replacement through the summer of 2007. Tokyo Rose group decides that they cannot wait for his studies and replaces him in the band with drummer Shawn Fichtner who went on to play w/Old Wives (FKA ActionReaction). Album releases on October 4, 2005, touring with Taking Back Sunday, as well as performing on the 2006 Vans Warped Tour.

On July 31, 2007 the band took on new member Jake Margolis and released their third full studio album The Promise in Compromise, since then they have been extensively touring the United States.

On January 16, 2026, the band released the track "Something Sweeter," their first new music in eighteen years.

=== Current lineup ===
- Ryan Dominguez (2001–present) - (Vocals/Guitar)
- Shawn Fichtner (2024–present) - (Drums)
- Matt Fleischman - (Guitar)
- Chris Poulsen - (Bass)

=== Former members ===
- Chris Poulsen (2001–2008) (Joins The Color Fred) (Bass)
- Greg Doran (2003–2007) - (Guitar)
- Josh Lurie (2005–2007) - (Guitar)
- Shawn Fichtner (touring drummer form the album New American Saint) current - (Drums)
- Matt Reilly - (Guitar)
- Mike Glita (Formerly of Senses Fail and Love Automatic) - (Drums)
- Rob Tassaro (2001–2003)- (Guitar)
- Tom Roslak - (Drums) - Up to date information on this performer/writer/producer at
- Jon Smith (2003–2005)- (Drums)
- Ryan Terry - guitar
- Jake Margolis -Drums

== Discography ==
=== EP's ===
- Chasing Fireflies (2001)
- Never Say Die (2026)

=== Albums ===
- Reinventing a Lost Art (2003)
- New American Saint (2005)
- The Promise in Compromise (2007)
