= Runner Runner (album) =

Studio album by Runner Runner
- Released: February 15, 2011
- Recorded: 2010
- Genres: Pop rock, power pop
- Length: 43:08
- Labels: Worldwide Pants Incorporated; Capitol Records; Merovingian Music
- Producer: Dave Darling

Singles from Runner Runner
- 1. "So Obvious" Released: May 18, 2010; 2. "Unstoppable" Released: June 21, 2010; 3. "Hey Alli" Released: December 10, 2010

Professional ratings
Review scores
| Source | Rating |
|---|---|
| AllMusic | 2.5/5 stars |
| AbsolutePunk | (19%) |

Runner Runner is the debut studio album by American pop rock band Runner Runner. It was originally scheduled for a September 28, 2010 release, but was pushed back until 2011. The album was released on February 15, 2011, through David Letterman's record label, Clear Entertainment/C.E. Music of Capitol Records. It peaked at number 185 on the Billboard 200 and number 3 on the Billboard Top Heatseekers.

The album's lead single, "So Obvious", was released on May 18, 2010, and has since become a moderate success, peaking at number 37 on the Billboard Pop Songs chart. The album has since spawned two more singles: "Unstoppable" and "Hey Alli".

== Track listing ==
| No. | Title | Length |
|---|---|---|
| 1. | "So Obvious" | 3:46 |
| 2. | "Unstoppable" | 3:18 |
| 3. | "Paper Cuts" | 3:40 |
| 4. | "Heart Attack" | 3:20 |
| 5. | "Hey Alli" | 3:17 |
| 6. | "Life After You" | 3:49 |
| 7. | "Falling" | 3:46 |
| 8. | "She's My Kinda Girl" | 3:51 |
| 9. | "Dedicate" | 3:41 |
| 10. | "I Can't Wait" | 3:55 |
| 11. | "See You Around" | 3:38 |
| 12. | "Running Away" | 3:07 |

== Personnel ==
- Dave Darling – Producer
- Ryan Ogren – Vocals, guitar
- Peter Munters – Guitars, vocals, keyboards
- Nick Bailey – Guitars, background vocals
- Jon Berry – Bass, background vocals
- James Ulrich – Drums
- Jim Recor – Management for Clear Entertainment
- Dale May – Photography

== Charts ==
| Chart (2011) | Peak position |
|---|---|
| Billboard 200 | 185 |
| Billboard Top Heatseekers | 3 |
