= Babylon A.D. (band) =

American hard rock band

- Origin: San Francisco, California, United States
- Genres: Hard rock, glam metal
- Years active: 1987–1994, 1998–2006, 2008–2010, 2013–present
- Labels: Arista; Apocalypse Records; Frontiers Records; Perris Records
- Members: Derek Davis; John Matthews; Ron Freschi; Dylan Soto; Craig Pepe
- Past members: Eric Pacheco; James Pacheco; Robb Reid; Nick Hernandez; Marc "Spyder" Webb; Danny De La Rosa

Babylon A.D. is an American hard rock band formed in 1987. Babylon A.D. hail from the San Francisco Bay Area, California, United States. In 1989, Babylon A.D. caught the attention of Arista Records president and industry music mogul Clive Davis, who signed them at a live showcase in Los Angeles. The band's first lineup was Derek Davis on vocals, guitarists Danny De La Rosa and Ron Freschi, drummer Jamey Pacheco and bassist Robb Reid.

== History ==
The debut album, Babylon A.D., was released in 1989, and included the hard rock songs "Bang Go the Bells", "Hammer Swings Down" and "The Kid Goes Wild", the latter used for the soundtrack and video for the Orion Pictures movie RoboCop 2.

Their sophomore effort, Nothing Sacred, was released in 1992. It produced two singles, "Bad Blood" and "So Savage the Heart". The band toured throughout the early 1990s and put several videos on MTV.

After spending several years with Arista, the band signed with Apocalypse Records in 1999 and released Live in Your Face, a compilation of live tracks recorded at various cities throughout the United States. The band's next release American Blitzkrieg, followed in 2000. In 2006, the band released In The Beginning... Persuaders Recordings 8688 on Apocalypse/Perris Records, which contained songs from the original demo tapes that secured them their record deal with Arista Records.

In between breaks in the band, Davis released three more records. In 2005 he and band member Jamey Pacheco released a blues rock album with the band American Blues Box. In 2012, Davis released his first studio effort (Re-Volt). In 2014, Davis's blues-based rock band Moonshine released their second, eponymous, album which was recorded at Eddie Van Halen's 5150 Studios with guest appearances by Michael Anthony and Jane Child.

Freschi was also busy during this time, recording and releasing his own band's debut Syrym in 2007.

After a long hiatus, Babylon A.D. regrouped with all original members and released a four-song EP Lost Sessions / Fresno, CA 93 in 2014. The band also played several shows in the U.S. and Nottingham, England's FireFest Rock Festival.

In 2015 the band released LIVE@XXV to celebrate their 25 years of recording and performing together. They played on the 2015 Monsters of Rock Cruise, along with Bay Area favorites Y&T, Tesla and Night Ranger as well as other select dates across the United States.

Revelation Highway was issued on Frontiers Records on November 10, 2017, and Davis spoke to The Rockpit about the making of the album and the return of original guitarist John Matthews.

Eric Pacheco, the band's former bassist who contributed to American Blitzkrieg, died at the age of 53 on December 6, 2020.

In 2023, the band released a third live album, Live Lightning, featuring live performances of 14 of their songs, and Jamey Pacheco left the band.

== Personnel ==
=== Current members ===
- Derek Davis – lead vocals, guitars, piano, tambourine, songwriter (1987–1994, 1998–2006, 2008–2010, 2013–present)
- Ron Freschi – guitars, backing vocals (1987–1994, 1998–2006, 2008–2010, 2013–2018, 2021–present)
- John Matthews – guitars, backing vocals (1987-1989, 2017–present)
- Dylan Soto - drums, percussion (2023–present)
- Craig Pepe - bass, backing vocals (2023–present)

=== Former members ===
- James "Jamey" Pacheco – drums, percussion (1987–1994, 1998–2006, 2008–2010, 2013–2023)
- Danny De La Rosa – guitars, banjo, backing vocals (1989–1994, 1998–2006, 2008–2010, 2013–2017)
- Robb Reid – bass guitar, backing vocals (1987–1994, 1998–2006, 2008–2010, 2013–2017, 2021)
- Eric Pacheco – bass guitar, backing vocals (2000, 2018-2020) (died 2020)

=== Touring members ===
- Nick Hernandez - guitar (2019-2021)
- Marc "Spyder" Webb - guitar (2019)

== Discography ==
=== Studio albums ===
- Babylon A.D. (1989)
- Nothing Sacred (1992)
- American Blitzkrieg (2000)
- Revelation Highway (2017)
- Rome Wasn't Built in a Day (2024)
- When The World Stops (2025)

=== Live albums ===
- Live in Your Face (1998)
- Live@XXV (2015)
- Live Lightning (2023)

=== Compilation albums ===
- In the Beginning... Persuaders Recordings 8688 (2006)

=== Extended plays ===
- Lost Sessions / Fresno, CA 93 (2014)

==== Promotional EPs ====
- Live at the Roxy (1991)

=== Singles ===
- "Bang Go the Bells" (1989)
- "Hammer Swings Down" (1989)
- "The Kid Goes Wild" (1990)
- "Desperate" (1990)
- "Bad Blood" (1992)
- "So Savage The Heart" (1992)
- "Psychedelic Sex Reaction" (1992)
- "American Blitzkrieg" (2000)
- "Sinking in the Sand" (2000)
- "Crash and Burn" (2017)
- "One Million Miles" (2017)
- "Wrecking Machine" (2024)
- "Rome Wasn't Built In A Day" (2024)
- "Sometimes Love Is Hell" (2024)
- "Face Of GOD" (2024)
- "When The World Stops" (2025)
- "Love Is Cruel" (2025)
- "Power Of Music" (2026)

==== Promotional singles ====
- "Slave Your Body" (1992)

=== Music videos ===
- Bang Go The Bells (1989)
- Hammer Swings Down (1989)
- The Kid Goes Wild (1990)
- Bad Blood (1992)
- So Savage The Heart (1992)
- American Blitzkrieg (2000)
- Crash And Burn (2017)
- One Million Miles (2018)
- Saturday Night (2018
- Kid Goes Wild Live (2023)
- Wrecking Machine (2024)
- Rome Wasn't Built In A Day (2024)
- Face Of GOD (2024)
- Sometimes Love Is Hell (2024)
- Pain (2024)
- When The World Stops! (2025)
- Love Is Cruel (2025)
- Power Of Music (2026)

=== Lyric videos ===
- Sometimes Love Is Hell (2024)
- Pain (2025)
- Love Is Cruel (2025)

== See also ==
- List of glam metal bands and artists
