= Lanemeyer =

American punk band

- Origin: New Jersey, U.S.
- Genres: Pop punk
- Years active: 1997–2001
- Labels: Red Leader Records; All About Records; Too Hep Records
- Past members: Chris Barker; Mike Doyle; Casey Lee Morgan; Sean Smith

Lanemeyer was an American pop punk band from northern New Jersey active between 1997 and 2001.

== History ==
Lanemeyer was formed in 1997, and became known for "shaping some of the more popular strains of punk". Taking their name from John Cusack's character Lane Meyer in the film Better Off Dead..., Lanemeyer were known for their humor and love of comedy. They broke up in 2001 after touring with bands such as The Lawrence Arms, Bigwig, River City High, Whippersnapper, and many more. After the breakup, several members continued to perform with other bands, such as The Forever Endeavor, The Gaslight Anthem, and Day at the Fair (Rushmore Records). Lanemeyer has reunited several times to play single shows, with varying member lineups.

In 2018, they re-released Stories for the Big Screen on limited green vinyl on I Surrender Records (Rob Hitt from Midtown's record label).

== Members ==
- Chris Barker (vocals/guitar)
- Mike Doyle (vocals/bass)
- Sean Smith (drums)
- Rob Heiner (guitar)
- Alan Rappaport (vocals/guitar)
- David Patino (drums)
- Andrew Bowman Spratt (guitar)
- Casey Lee Morgan (guitar)
- Brian Fallon (vocals/guitar)

== Discography ==
- Stories for the Big Screen EP (1999, Red Leader Records)
- Lanemeyer/Emanuel Nice Split (2000)
- If There's a Will, There's Still Nothing (2000, Too Hep Records)
- Songs We Hated The Least (free retrospective compilation CD handed out at their first reunion show)
- Whispering Every Word into a Smile (2006, Top 5/All About Records)

Compilation appearances

- Punk Uprisings: Incompatible, Vol. 1 – song "Me and You on the Big Screen" (Victory Records, 1998)
- Punked Up Love – song "Fuck You And Your Boyfriend" (VMS Records, 2000)
- Punk Rock Strike: Punk Rock Strikes Back, Vol. 2 – song "Alarm" (Springman Records, 2001)

== Related bands ==
- Arcade Academy – Mike Doyle
- the Look Away – Sean Smith
- The Gaslight Anthem – Brian Fallon
- This Charming Man – Brian Fallon
- Cincinnati Rail Tie – Brian Fallon, Casey Lee Morgan
- Revolution Summer – Casey Lee Morgan
- The Forever Endeavor – Casey Lee Morgan
- We're All Broken – Casey Lee Morgan
