= Rufio =

American pop punk band

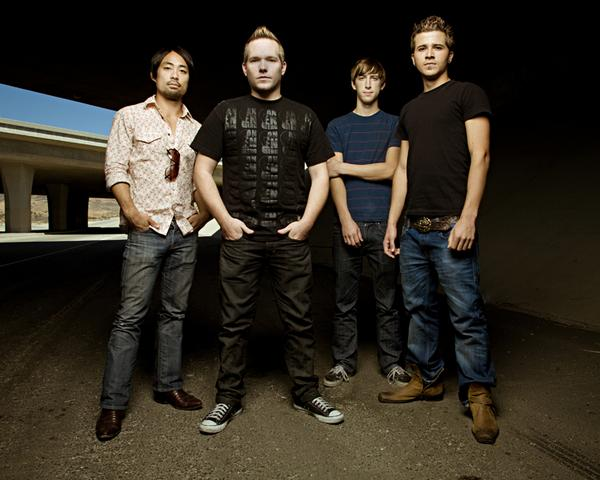
- Rufio in 2009

Background information
- Origin: Rancho Cucamonga, California, U.S.
- Genres: Pop-punk
- Years active: 2000–2007; 2008; 2009–2012; 2015; 2026–present
- Labels: The Militia Group; Nitro Records; Double Helix Records; Double Felix Records
- Members: Scott Sellers; Clark Domae; Taylor Albaugh
- Past members: Jon Berry; Mike Jimenez; Nathan Walker; Terry Stirling Jr.; Jeremy Binion

Rufio is an American pop-punk band formed in 2000 in Rancho Cucamonga, California. The original lineup consisted of Scott Sellers on vocals and guitar, Clark Domae on lead guitar, Jon Berry on bass, and Mike Jimenez on drums.

The band released four studio albums: Perhaps, I Suppose... (2001), MCMLXXXV (2003), The Comfort of Home (2005), and Anybody Out There (2010). After becoming inactive in 2012, Rufio played a one-off reunion show in 2015 and returned with new material in 2026.

== History ==
=== Formation and early releases (2000–2005) ===
Rufio was formed in Rancho Cucamonga in 2000 by Scott Sellers, Clark Domae, Jon Berry, and Mike Jimenez. Sellers performed lead vocals and guitar, Domae played lead guitar, Berry played bass, and Jimenez played drums.

The band released its debut studio album, Perhaps, I Suppose..., in 2001. In November of that year, Rufio signed with Nitro Records.

In November and December 2002, Rufio supported The Ataris on a U.S. tour alongside Sugarcult and Autopilot Off.

The band's second studio album, MCMLXXXV, was released in 2003 through Nitro Records and was produced by Nick Raskulinecz. Rufio also performed on dates of the Warped Tour that year.

Their third studio album, The Comfort of Home, followed in July 2005. During the album's promotional cycle, the band toured the United States with MxPx and Relient K.

=== Lineup changes and initial breakup (2006–2008) ===
Berry left Rufio in early 2006, with Jimenez departing shortly afterward. The band continued performing with replacement musicians before announcing its breakup in 2007.

Rufio played its final U.S. shows in June 2007 and subsequently undertook a short farewell tour of South America. Despite the breakup announcement, the band played several additional shows during 2008.

=== Reformation and Anybody Out There (2009–2012) ===
Rufio officially re-formed in 2009. Taylor Albaugh joined on bass and Terry Stirling Jr. on drums, alongside Sellers and Domae.

The band released the EP The Loneliest in early 2010, followed by its fourth studio album, Anybody Out There, on July 27, 2010.

Domae left the group in October 2010. By early 2011, guitarist Jeremy Binion had joined the touring lineup, replacing Domae. At the time, Rufio consisted of Sellers, Albaugh, Stirling and Binion.

In 2011, the band announced a South American tour with performances in Ecuador, Colombia, Argentina and Brazil. Rufio became inactive again in 2012.

=== Reunion show (2015) ===
Rufio reunited for a one-off performance at Amnesia Rockfest in Montebello, Quebec, in June 2015. The set consisted primarily of songs from the band's first two albums, Perhaps, I Suppose... and MCMLXXXV.

=== Return and From the Outside (2026) ===
On June 12, 2026, Rufio released a newly recorded version of "Dipshit", a song originally included on Perhaps, I Suppose..., to coincide with the 25th anniversary of the band's debut album.

The band subsequently released "Maps" on July 10, 2026. The song was described as Rufio's first newly written material in 16 years and was released as the lead single from the EP From the Outside.

From the Outside is scheduled for release on August 7, 2026, through Double Helix Records and Double Felix Records. The EP contains five tracks: "Maps", "From the Outside", "Last Goodbye", "The Worst", and "Another Letdown".

The material was primarily written by Sellers, Domae and Albaugh, with Dylan Roy performing drums. The EP was produced by Rufio, mixed by Sam Guaiana and mastered by Jason Livermore at The Blasting Room.

According to the band, the EP was written without an intention to follow contemporary musical trends or deliberately produce a commercially successful single. Sellers said that the new material reflected the members' experiences as adults, while the songs address subjects including family, loss, anxiety, reconciliation and resilience.

== Musical style ==
Rufio is primarily classified as a pop-punk band. AllMusic also associates the group with emo pop and has compared its sound with that of Blink-182 and Sum 41.

The band's music is characterized by melodic songwriting combined with fast tempos and technically oriented guitar arrangements.

== Members ==
=== Current members ===
- Scott Sellers – lead vocals, rhythm guitar
- Clark Domae – lead guitar, backing vocals
- Taylor Albaugh – bass, backing vocals

The three musicians reunited creatively for the band's 2026 material.

=== Former members ===
- Jon Berry – bass, backing vocals
- Mike Jimenez – drums
- Nathan Walker – drums
- Terry Stirling Jr. – drums
- Jeremy Binion – guitar, backing vocals

=== Timeline ===
The 2015 segments represent a one-off reunion performance rather than continuous activity throughout the year.

== Discography ==
=== Studio albums ===
- Perhaps, I Suppose... (2001)
- MCMLXXXV (2003)
- The Comfort of Home (2005)
- Anybody Out There (2010)

=== EPs ===
- Rufio EP (2003)
- The Loneliest (2010)
- From the Outside (2026)

=== 2026 singles ===
- "Dipshit" (re-recorded version)
- "Maps"
