= The Horrible Crowes =

American band

- Origin: New Jersey, United States
- Genres: Blues, soul, rock
- Years active: 2011–2013
- Labels: SideOneDummy Records
- Spinoff of: The Gaslight Anthem
- Past members: Brian Fallon; Ian Perkins; Alex Rosamilia

The Horrible Crowes was a musical duo consisting of vocalist and guitarist Brian Fallon and guitarist Ian Perkins. Fallon is also the front man in The Gaslight Anthem, a band he formed in 2006, with Perkins serving as the band's touring tech and an auxiliary live guitarist. Their debut album and only full-length studio release, Elsie, was released on September 6, 2011, through SideOneDummy Records.

== Formation ==
Fallon announced the formation of the Horrible Crowes on January 20, 2011, on his blog, explaining that "the name comes from a poem called the "Twa Corbies", which means "two crows". He added: "Check it out, it's a dark commentary on life. It's the darker side of soul music, it's slow, it slithers, and it's raw. At the same time, the melodies and pianos are a juxtaposition to the topic material because it's eerily soothing. I'm really proud of what's been coming out and we'll see how it goes, but it's in the works and it's heading for an actual record."

Fallon also said the group would to do some touring, but on a far smaller scale than the Gaslight Anthem. He also assured his fans that the Horrible Crowes would be, in his words, a "for me" project and that he would continue to focus on the Gaslight Anthem.

== Releases ==
A preview of the track "Black Betty and the Moon" from the upcoming album was posted on YouTube on June 21, 2011.

The Horrible Crowes' first single, "Behold the Hurricane", was made available for streaming through RollingStone.com on July 13, 2011. A music video was released featuring actor Joseph Mawle. On September 20, the video for "Behold the Hurricane" was uploaded to the Horrible Crowes' website.

On September 1, 2011, Rolling Stone streamed the debut album Elsie in its entirety. The physical album was released in the United States on September 6, 2011. The album was reported to be a departure from the sound and attitude of the Gaslight Anthem. Fallon, in describing the album, said: "As much as I have this fantasy in the Gaslight Anthem of being Bruce Springsteen, I also have this fantasy of being Tom Waits or Greg Dulli. These songs are very dark; they're like hymns for lonely people, it’s really a trip through a breakdown and that descent into madness and hopefully redemption." Fallon and Perkins will begin playing a limited number of shows in support of the album starting September 8.

On December 2, 2011, "Huffington Post" blogger Jon Chattman named "Elsie" the #2 album of 2011. He wrote, "Out of nowhere, this Gaslight Anthem (don't call it a) side project resonated with me so strongly. There's not a bad song on this."

On September 24, 2013, the band released a live DVD/LP/CD of their second-ever live performance at the Troubadour on September 14, 2011.

== Discography ==
=== Albums ===
- Elsie (2011)

=== Singles ===
- "Behold the Hurricane" (2011)
- "Ladykiller" (2012)
