= Ted Hutt =

British musician

- Origin: United Kingdom
- Occupations: Record producer, musician, songwriter
- Instruments: Guitar, bass, mandolin, banjo

Ted Hutt is a British record producer, musician, and songwriter, residing in Los Angeles, California, United States. He was the original guitar player and one of the founding members for The Promise, The Great Unwashed, Gods Hotel, Reacharound, and Flogging Molly.

== Career ==
After his departure from Flogging Molly, to pursue record production, Hutt has worked with The Gaslight Anthem, Flogging Molly, including their RIAA certified Gold recording Drunken Lullabies and its followup Within a Mile of Home, The Bouncing Souls, Lucero, Dropkick Murphys, Nahko and Medicine for the People, The Devil Makes Three, Violent Femmes, Tiger Army, Brian Fallon, Old Crow Medicine Show and The Mighty Mighty Bosstones amongst other notable artists.

In December 2008 eMusic named The '59 Sound by The Gaslight Anthem the best album of 2008. NME rated it as one of the best album of the year. The album's title track was included in Rolling Stone's top 100 songs of the year. and received an 8.6/10 rating from Pitchfork Media.

Hutt also produced the band's third album American Slang for SideOneDummy. Recorded at Magic Shop Studios NYC and released June 15, 2010 it debuted at number 16 on Billboard 200, number 18 on the UK Albums Chart and number 1 on both US and UK indie top 100s. It also featured a song "The Diamond Church Street Choir" which was number 39 in Rolling Stone's top 50 songs of 2010 and the album was included in a number of major publication's best of 2010 lists including Spin, Kerrang!, Uncut and the UK style and music magazine Clash. Both The '59 Sound has been certified Gold and American Slang Silver in the UK by the BPI.

Also in 2010, Hutt produced and mixed the Dropkick Murphy's Going Out In Style. Recorded in Cambridge Mass at Q Division Studio's it features a guest appearance by Bruce Springsteen. It was released March 1, 2011 entering the Billboard 200 chart at number 6, making it the highest charting album in the band's history, selling 43,000 copies in its first week. He produced and mixed Gaslight Anthem Brian Fallons new project The Horrible Crowes "Elsie". On December 2, 2011, Huffington Post blogger Jon Chattman named "Elsie" the number 2 album of 2011. He wrote, "Out of nowhere, this Gaslight Anthem (don't call it a) side project resonated with me so strongly. There's not a bad song on this." Also Old Crow Medicine Show's Carry Me Back sold over 17,000 copies in its debut week, landing at number 22 on the Billboard 200 in August 2012, leading to both the band's best ever sales week and their highest ever charting position. The album also was number 1 on both the Bluegrass and Folk charts and number 4 in the Country album in the nation It remained on the Billboard Bluegrass Chart for over 21 weeks. Later that year he produced the Dropkick Murphy's second top 10 album Signed and Sealed in Blood which reached number 9 on the Billboard 200 in January 2013.

In 2014, Hutt produced and mixed the Old Crow Medicine Show album, Remedy, which reached number 15 on Billboard 200 and was the 57th Annual Grammy Awards winner for Best Folk Album. The song "Sweet Amarillo" was number 20 on Rolling Stone's 50 best songs of 2014. Also, in the same year, he recorded Getting Through with The Riptide Movement at Grouse Lodge Studios, County Westmeath, Ireland, released on 4 April 2014 by Universal Music Group. It reached number #1 on the Irish Albums Chart and was certified Gold by the IRMA.

In 2015, Hutt produced and mixed Go Betty Go's first recording in a decade, an EP titled Reboot. He also produced all of their previous releases.

In 2016, he produced his third Dropkick Murphys record, which was also the third produced by Hutt to make the top 10 on the US chart. Recorded at Sonic Ranch in El Paso, Texas, 11 Short Stories of Pain & Glory was released on January 6, 2017, and reached number 8 on the Billboard 200 and number 1 on both the Billboard Alternative and Rock Charts.

In June 2019, Hutt, alongside The Pogues James Fearnley and Marc Orrell of Dropkick Murphys, announced the formation of a new supergroup, The Walker Roaders. The Walker Roaders' debut record was released on August 23, 2019.

== Production discography ==
Year	Artist	Album	Label	Credit(s)
2002	Flogging Molly	Drunken Lullabies	SideOneDummy Records	Producer, Mixed
2002	Madcap	East to West	SideOneDummy Records	Produced, Mixed
2002	Crashpalace	Crashpalace	Trauma	Produced
2003	The Flash Express	Introducing the Dynamite Sound of	Hit It Now! Records	Produced, Engineered, Mixed
2004	MxPx	B-Movie	SideOneDummy Records	Mixed
2004	Flogging Molly	Within a Mile of Home	SideOneDummy Records	Produced, Mixed
2004	Madcap	Under Suspicion	Victory Records	Produced, Mixed
2004	Go Betty Go	Worst Enemy EP	SideOneDummy Records	Produced, Mixed
2004	Diana Anaid	Beautiful Obscene	Five Crowns	Produced, Bass
2005	Go Betty Go	Nothing Is More	SideOneDummy Records	Banjo, Produced, Mixed
2006	Flogging Molly	Whiskey on a Sunday	SideOneDummy Records	Producer, Mixed
2006	The Bouncing Souls	The Gold Record	Epitaph Records	Produced, Mixed
2006	Street Dogs	Fading American Dream	DRT Entertainment	Produced, Mixed
2006	Scotch Greens	Professional	DRT Entertainment	Produced, Mixed
2007	Chuck Ragan	Feast or Famine	SideOneDummy Records	Produced, Mixed, Mandolin
2007	Chuck Ragan	Los Feliz	SideOneDummy Records	Mandolin
2008	The Gaslight Anthem	The '59 Sound	SideOneDummy Records	Produced, Mixed
2008	The Gaslight Anthem	"Even Cowgirls Get the Blues" Single	SideOneDummy Records	Produced, Mixed
2008	Bayside	Live at the Bayside Social Club	Victory Records	Produced, Mixed
2008	Street Dogs	State of Grace	Hellcat Records	Produced, Mixed, Guitar
2009	Lucero	1372 Overton Park	Universal Republic	Produced, Mixed
2009	The Bouncing Souls	"Gasoline" Single	Chunksaah Records	Produced, Mixed
2009	The Bouncing Souls	20th Anniversary Series	Chunksaah Records	Produced, Mixed
2009	The Mighty Mighty Bosstones	Pin Points and Gin Joints	Big Rig Records	Produced, Mixed
2009	Audra Mae	Haunt EP	SideOneDummy Records	Produced, Mixed, Guitar, Bass, Banjo Dobro
2009	Dusty Rhodes and the River Band	Palace and Stage	SideOneDummy Records	Produced, Mixed
2009	Nathen Maxwell	Nathen Maxwell and the O.B.G.	SideOneDummy Records	Produced, Mixe,. Guitar, Dobro
2010	Fake Problems	Real Ghosts Caught On Tape	SideOneDummy Records	Producing, Mixing
2010	The Gaslight Anthem	"Tumbling Dice" 7"	SideOneDummy Records	Production, Engineering
2010	The Gaslight Anthem	American Slang	SideOneDummy Records	Producing, Mixing
2010	Audra Mae	Happiest Lamb	SideOneDummy Records	Produced, Mixed, Guitar, Dobro, Dulcimer, Bass
2010	Jesse Malin	Love It to Life	SideOneDummy Records	Produced, Mixed, Guitar
2010	The Bouncing Souls	Ghosts on the Boardwalk	Chunksaah Records	Produced, Mixed, Slide Guitar
2011	Dropkick Murphys	Going Out In Style	Born & Bred Records	Producing, Mixing
2011	Danny and the Champions of the World	Hearts and Arrows	Loose Music	Guitar, Mixed
2011	The Horrible Crowes	Elsie	SideOneDummy Records	Guitar, Produced, Mixed
2011	The Mighty Mighty Bosstones	The Magic of Youth	Big Rig Records	Produced, Mixed
2012	Lucero	Women & Work	ATO Records	Produced, Mixed
2012	Riverboat Gamblers	The Wolf You Feed	Volcom Entertainment	Pre Produced
2012	Old Crow Medicine Show	Carry Me Back	ATO Records	Produced, Mixed
2013	Bobby Long	TBD	ATO Records	Produced, Mixed
2013	Dropkick Murphys	Signed and Sealed in Blood	Born & Bred Records	Producer
2013	Georgia Fair	TBD	Sony Music	Produced, Mixed
2013	Transit	Young New England	Rise Records	Producer
2013	Yellow Red Sparks	TBD	ORG Music	Produced
2014	Old Crow Medicine Show	Remedy	ATO Records	Produced, Mixed
2014	The Riptide Movement	Getting Through	Universal Music	Produced, Mixed
2015	Go Betty Go	Reboot	Independent	Produced, Mixed, Guitar tracks 3, 6
2015	Skinny Lister	Down on Deptford Broadway	Xtra Mile Recordings	Produced, Mixed, Guitar
2015	Lucero	All a Man Should Do	ATO Records	Produced, Mixed
2016	Tiger Army	V •••–	Rise Records	Produced, Mixed, Acoustic guitar
2016	Nahko and Medicine for the People	HOKA	SideOneDummy Records	Produced, Mixed
2016	The Riptide Movement	Ghosts	Universal Music	Produced, Mixed, Guitar
2017	Dropkick Murphys	11 Short Stories of Pain & Glory	Born & Bred Records	Producer, Mixed
2017	Old Crow Medicine Show	Blonde on Blonde	Columbia Records	Mixed
2017	Dustbowl Revival	Dustbowl Revival	Signature Sounds Recordings	Producer, Mixed
2018	The Mighty Mighty Bosstones	While We're at It	Big Rig Records	Producer
2018	Brian Fallon	Sleepwalkers	Island Records	Producer, Mixed
2018	The Devil Makes Three	Chains Are Broken	New West Records	Producer, Mixed
2019	Tiger Army	Retrofuture	Rise Records	Producer, Mixed
2019	Violent Femmes	Hotel Last Resort	PIAS Recordings	Producer, Mixed
2020	The Drowns	Under Tension	Pirates Press Records	Producer, Mixed
2020	The Claudettes	High Times in the Dark	Forty Below Records	Producer, Mixed
2021	Dropkick Murphys	Turn Up That Dial	Born & Bred Records	Producer, Mixed
2022	The Drowns	Lunatics	Pirates Press Records	Producer, Mixed
2024	The Drowns	Blacked Out	Pirates Press Records	Producer, Mixed
2025	Dropkick Murphys	For the People	Born & Bred Records	Producer, Mixed
2025	The Devil Makes Three	Spirits	New West Records	Producer, Mixed
