= Nothing Lasts =

Nothing Lasts may refer to:

- Nothing Lasts... But Nothing Is Lost, a 2005 album by Shpongle
- Nothing Lasts (album), a 2019 album by DJ Speedsick

== See also ==
- Nothing Lasts Forever (disambiguation)
