= Signed and Sealed in Blood =

Studio album by Dropkick Murphys
- Released: January 8, 2013
- Recorded: May–July 2012
- Studios: Q Division Studios (Somerville, Massachusetts)
- Genres: Celtic punk, folk punk
- Length: 40:49
- Label: Born & Bred
- Producer: Ted Hutt

Dropkick Murphys chronology
Going Out in Style (2011)	Signed and Sealed in Blood (2013)	Rose Tattoo: For Boston Charity (2013)

Deluxe Edition cover
- Signed and Sealed in Blood: Deluxe Edition

Singles from Signed and Sealed in Blood
- 1. "Rose Tattoo" Released: November 7, 2012; 2. "The Season's Upon Us" Released: December 18, 2012; 3. "The Boys Are Back" Released: January 31, 2013; 4. "Out of Our Heads" Released: September 6, 2013

Signed and Sealed in Blood is the eighth studio album by the Dropkick Murphys. The album was released on January 8, 2013, on the band's Born & Bred Records label. The album debuted at No. 9 on the Billboard 200 albums chart, the third highest debut for the band.

The album has produced four singles including "Rose Tattoo" and "The Season's Upon Us", a Christmas themed song that became one of the band's more successful charting singles. "The Boys Are Back" and "Out of Our Heads" (which was also used as the theme song for the television show, Boston's Finest) were also released as singles. A special 2013 charity version titled "Rose Tattoo" featuring Bruce Springsteen was released in response to the Boston Marathon bombing. The single reached No. 25 on the Rock Songs chart. "Prisoner's Song" has been heavily featured in commercials for Captain Morgan's liquor and in July 2017 it was used in the season 8 trailer for The Walking Dead. It was also the final album to feature Scruffy Wallace on Bagpipes and Whistles.

== Background ==
On August 31, 2012, the band announced the album's title and first single, "Rose Tattoo" through their Facebook page. The title of the album is taken from lyrics in "Rose Tattoo". The band asked fans to tattoo themselves with the new logo from the album's cover and send photos and videos to their web site by September 19, 2012. The images were used in the packaging for the CD and vinyl album.

The album has sold 106,000 copies as of September 10, 2013.

== Musical style ==
Where "Going Out in Style" told the story of a fictional character named Cornelius Larkin—complete with an obituary written by Michael Patrick MacDonald for the liner notes – "Signed..." has no such constraints. "This is just the opposite of that," bassist Ken Casey explains, "just us having fun and making the most catchy, singalong kind of songs we can. It's not that the last album wasn't fun. It was. 'Going Out in Style' is one of the records I'm most proud of, of anything we've done. But it gave me a couple migraines along the way, getting through that because everything was so connected. This time we cut loose." But he does feel that "Signed..." is also "almost a continuation of ('Going Out in Style'), in a musical sense. There's an upbeat, party vibe to it. A lot of these songs, we were having such a good time writing them and just enjoying the writing process. It's the quickest we've released an album, ever, after another."

The group previewed some of the songs on the album during its Halfway To St. Patrick's Day U.S. tour. Casey described the final track, "End of the Night," as "the closing time, kind of loser's anthem, about people who don't want to go home." The album also features a holiday song called "The Seasons Upon Us," which Casey promised "is definitely not some cheesy Christmas tune. It's about a dysfunctional family."

== Critical reception ==
Professional ratings
Aggregate scores
Source	Rating
Metacritic	77/100
Review scores
Source	Rating
AllMusic	4/5 stars
The A.V. Club	B+
The Boston Globe	(favorable)
Consequence of Sound	C+
Kerrang!	4/5 stars
Los Angeles Times	3/4 stars
musicOMH	3.5/5 stars
PopMatters	6/10 stars
Rolling Stone	3.5/5 stars

Signed and Sealed in Blood was well received by music critics. The album holds an average critic score of 77/100 at Metacritic, based on 17 critics, indicating "generally favorable reviews". Gregory Heaney of AllMusic gave the album four out of five stars called it "an album that's sure to please Murphys fans both old and new". At The Observer, Hermione Hoby gave the album two stars out of five, criticising it as 'hearty but slightly absurd'.

== Track listing ==
No.	Title	Length
1.	"The Boys Are Back"	3:20
2.	"Prisoner's Song"	2:47
3.	"Rose Tattoo"	5:06
4.	"Burn"	2:39
5.	"Jimmy Collins' Wake" (Lyrics by Richard Johnson)	2:59
6.	"The Season's Upon Us"	4:02
7.	"The Battle Rages On"	2:17
8.	"Don't Tear Us Apart"	3:01
9.	"My Hero"	3:10
10.	"Out on the Town"	3:02
11.	"Out of Our Heads"	3:11
12.	"End of the Night"	5:17
Total length:		40:49

Vinyl Tracks
No.	Title	Length
13.	"Shark Attack"

Deluxe Edition tracks
No.	Title	Length
13.	"Lucky Charlie"
14.	"The Boys are Back (acoustic)"

Apple Music tracke
No.	Title	Length
13.	"Lucky Charlie"
14.	"Rose Tattoo (official video)"
15.	"The Season’s Upon Us (official video)"

Bonus tracks
No.	Title	Length
1.	"78 RPM" (Stiff Little Fingers Cover, written by Jake Burns and Gordon Ogilvie. Bonus digital download card with Deluxe Edition)
2.	"The Battle Rages On (Acoustic)" (Pre-order bonus digital download card)
3.	"AK-47 (All I Want For Christmas Is An)" ("The Season's Upon Us" 7-inch single)

Fans who pre-ordered the album through the band's website received MP3 download of the song, "The Season's Upon Us" as well as a digital download card with their order which included three exclusive songs. "The Season's Upon Us" was also released as a 7-inch single in special colors of red, green and white with the non-album b-side "AK-47 (All I Want For Christmas Is An)".

== Personnel ==
Dropkick Murphys

- Al Barr – lead vocals
- Tim Brennan – guitars, accordion, bouzouki, piano, whistle, vocals
- Ken Casey – lead vocals, bass guitar
- Jeff DaRosa – banjo, bouzouki, mandolin, mandola, acoustic guitar, piano, autoharp, vocals
- Matt Kelly – drums, vocals
- James Lynch – guitars, vocals
- Scruffy Wallace – bagpipes, whistles

Additional musicians

- Winston Marshall – guest banjo on "Rose Tattoo"
- Michelle DaRosa – vocals on "Rose Tattoo" and "The Season's Upon Us"
- Parkington Sisters – strings on various songs, vocals on "End of the Night" and "Shark Attack"
- Niki Cremmen – vocals on "Rose Tattoo"
- So Many Close Friends – additional gang vocals on various songs

== Charts ==
Chart performance
Chart (2013)	Peak position
Australian Albums (ARIA)	23
Austrian Albums (Ö3 Austria)	9
Belgian Albums (Ultratop Flanders)	30
Belgian Albums (Ultratop Wallonia)	66
Canadian Albums (Billboard)	16
Dutch Albums (Album Top 100)	65
Dutch Alternative Albums (Alternative Top 30)	12
Finnish Albums (Suomen virallinen lista)	22
French Albums (SNEP)	161
German Albums (Offizielle Top 100)	5
Norwegian Albums (VG-lista)	7
Scottish Albums (Official Charts)	85
Swedish Albums (Sverigetopplistan)	4
Swiss Albums (Schweizer Hitparade)	27
UK Albums (Official Charts)	88
UK Rock & Metal Albums (Official Charts)	7
US Billboard 200	9
US Independent Albums (Billboard)	2
US Indie Store Album Sales (Billboard)	2
US Top Alternative Albums (Billboard)	3
US Top Rock Albums (Billboard)	4
