= Going Out in Style =

Studio album by Dropkick Murphys
- Released: March 1, 2011
- Recorded: December 2010 – January 2011
- Genres: Celtic punk, folk punk
- Length: 45:43
- Label: Born & Bred Records
- Producer: Ted Hutt

Dropkick Murphys chronology
Live on Lansdowne, Boston MA (2010)	Going Out in Style (2011)	Signed and Sealed in Blood (2013)

Alternative cover
- Going Out In Style: Fenway Park Bonus Edition

Singles from Going Out in Style
- 1. "Going Out in Style" Released: March 1, 2011; 2. "Memorial Day" Released: March 17, 2011; 3. "Sunday Hardcore Matinee" Released: 2012

Going Out in Style is the seventh studio album by the Dropkick Murphys and was released on March 1, 2011. It was the band's second studio release on their Born & Bred Records label. The album is the band's highest charting to date making its debut at number 6 on the Billboard Hot 200 album charts. It was also the first to feature new member Jeff DaRosa.

Three singles have been released from the album including "Going Out in Style", "Memorial Day" and "Sunday Hardcore Matinee". All three singles were also made into music videos.

The album was re-released on March 13, 2012 as the Fenway Park Bonus Edition. It includes the full studio album and an 18 song live CD recorded at Fenway Park in Boston, MA while the limited edition vinyl version, Live at Fenway includes two bonus live songs not available on the CD.

== Musical style ==
Going Out in Style is a concept album, blending the band's own personal experiences and family folklore into the story of a fictional character named Cornelius Larkin. Going Out in Style traces the journey of Larkin, whether it's the Irish immigrant's first person account of his own wake or the band's in depth interpretation of his life and lineage throughout the album's lyrics. According to bassist/vocalist, Ken Casey, "Cornelius has passed on to the other side, and the album becomes a retrospective of his life." The liner notes for the album will feature an obituary for Larkin written by author Michael Patrick MacDonald. The band says that the story of Larkin evolved into a saga which will eventually be told through their website and could eventually become a book someday. Going Out In Style signals the beginning of another chapter in Dropkick Murphys' own story. Vocalist Al Barr said, "I hope fans can listen to Going Out In Style with the same excitement we have. It’s all about family and friends for us. No bullshit here… we don’t like to convolute things."

The album delves deeper into Irish folk than their previous albums. "Broken Hymns", "Cruel" and "1953" all feature very Irish sounds and themes, dealing with immigration to the United States. A few of the songs break from the concept of the album. "The Hardest Mile" pays tribute to a group of 57 Irish immigrants, who were hired by railroad contractor Philip Duffy to lay a section of tracks for the Philadelphia and Columbia Railroad in a valley now known as Duffy’s Cut (located about 30 miles west of Philadelphia) and disappeared under mysterious circumstances in August 1832. While they are widely believed to have died during the second cholera pandemic, forensic evidence suggests that some of them may have been murdered. "Sunday Hardcore Matinee" is a nostalgic song about the band's trips to hardcore punk shows during their adolescence. "Take Em' Down" is a pro-union song dedicated to Wisconsin workers protesting the anti-labor legislation passed by Governor Scott Walker. The album also includes two traditional Irish covers: "Peg o' My Heart" and "The Irish Rover."

The album also features guest appearances by Bruce Springsteen, NOFX vocalist Fat Mike, Chris Cheney from The Living End and actor/comedian Lenny Clarke. Guitarist James Lynch's father, Pat Lynch makes an appearance on "The Irish Rover". On January 18, 2011, Rolling Stone began streaming the song "Memorial Day" on their website. On February 2, 2011, Alternative Press released an exclusive stream of the song, "Hang 'Em High".

== Promotion and release ==
In the thirteen days leading up to the album's release, the Dropkick Murphys announced that they would preview a song each day through their Facebook page along with a video discussing the song. On February 22, 2011, the band released their song, "Take 'Em Down" through their website and dedicated it to the thousands of Wisconsin union workers who have been protesting the current budget plan of Wisconsin Governor Scott Walker. The band also plan to release limited edition T-shirts to raise money for the Worker's Right Emergency Fund. The music video for the first single, "Going Out in Style" was released on March 1, 2011 (the same day the album was released) and features cameos by Fat Mike, Chris Cheney, Lenny Clarke, Bobby Orr, Micky Ward, Kevin Youkilis, Jonathan Papelbon, Shawn Thornton, Milan Lucic, Heidi Watney among many others.

A bonus track, "Walk Don't Run", is included on some versions of the album, including the Japanese CD and the iTunes version. Going Out In Style debuted on the Billboard 200 Chart at #6, making it the highest-charting album in the band's history, selling 43,259 copies in its first week.

On March 17, 2011, the music video for the second single, "Memorial Day" was released. On March 17, ESPN featured a segment on band's music video for "Going Out In Style" and how the video featured cameos by some of Boston's sports stars from the past and present. An expanded version of the album, Going Out in Style: Fenway Park Bonus Edition, is set for release on March 13, 2012.

The band released "Sunday Hardcore Matinee" as the album's third single on March 20, 2012. The single was released as limited edition to 1,000 copies picture-disc 7″ available exclusively through the Dropkick Murphys webstore and the Bridge Nine Store. The 7" features two tracks recorded live from band's Fenway Park shows from September 2011. Side A will contain “Sunday Hardcore Matinee” while Side B will boast the live track “Broken Hymns”. 100 copies have been held aside for the band to sell directly to fans attending the March 14/15/16 homecoming shows at Boston’s House of Blues.

== Reception ==
Professional ratings
Aggregate scores
Source	Rating
Metacritic	81/100
Review scores
Source	Rating
AllMusic	4/5 stars
About.com	5/5 stars
Alternative Press	4/5 stars
The A.V. Club	B+
Classic Rock	3.5/5 stars
Consequence of Sound	4/5 stars
IGN	8/10
PopMatters	7/10
Rolling Stone	3.5/5 stars
Tom Hull	B+

The album has been mainly well received by critics. In their review, PopMatters stated that: "If you like Dropkick Murphys, you're going to like Going Out in Style." Regarding the album's concept they added: "The fictional character Cornelius Larkin is just the kind of man you would expect to find on a Dropkick Murphys release: a rough-around-the-edges working-class Irish immigrant who predictably can hold his liquor and knows his way around a good old fashioned brawl." Rolling Stone summed up the album by saying "The Boston Irish-punk septet never met a shout-along chorus they didn't want to crash into, with a bagpipe tooting along for an extra shot of old-world poignancy." About.com raved that "It's a broad evolutionary album for the band - their most ambitious yet - and as result it's an exciting time for music."

== Track listing ==
No.	Title	Writer(s)	Length
1.	"Hang 'Em High"		3:59
2.	"Going Out in Style" (featuring Fat Mike, Chris Cheney, and Lenny Clarke)		4:08
3.	"The Hardest Mile"		3:26
4.	"Cruel"		4:21
5.	"Memorial Day"		2:59
6.	"Climbing a Chair to Bed"		2:59
7.	"Broken Hymns"		5:03
8.	"Deeds Not Words"		3:41
9.	"Take 'Em Down"		2:11
10.	"Sunday Hardcore Matinee"		2:43
11.	"1953"	Dropkick Murphys	4:14
12.	"Peg o' My Heart" (featuring Bruce Springsteen)	Alfred Bryan and Fred Fisher	2:20
13.	"The Irish Rover" (featuring Pat Lynch)	Traditional	3:39

=== iTunes version ===
iTunes version contains the bonus track "Walk Don't Run" between the last two songs

=== Fenway Park (bonus edition) ===
1. "Hang 'Em High"
2. "Sunday Hardcore Matinee"
3. "Deeds Not Words"
4. "Going Out in Style"
5. "The Irish Rover"
6. "Peg o' My Heart"
7. "Tessie"
8. "Cruel"
9. "Climbing a Chair to Bed"
10. "Take 'Em Down"
11. "Devil's Brigade"
12. "Boys On The Docks"
13. "The Dirty Glass"
14. "The State of Massachusetts"
15. "Kiss Me, I'm Shitfaced"
16. "Time To Go"
17. "I'm Shipping Up To Boston"
18. "T.N.T."
- The bonus edition, includes the full studio album plus a 20-song live CD live at Fenway Park in Boston, MA. The limited edition vinyl version, Live at Fenway, includes two bonus tracks ("Memorial Day" and "Echoes on "A" Street") not available on the CD.

== Personnel ==
Dropkick Murphys

- Al Barr – lead vocals
- Tim Brennan – guitars, accordion, whistles, vocals
- Ken Casey – lead vocals, bass guitar
- Jeff DaRosa – banjo, bouzouki, mandolin, harmonica, vocals
- Matt Kelly – drums, vocals
- James Lynch – guitars, vocals
- Scruffy Wallace – bagpipes

Parkington Sisters

- Ariel Parkington – strings and backing vocals
- Lydia Parkington – strings and backing vocals
- Nora Parkington – strings and backing vocals
- Rose Parkington – strings and backing vocals
- Sarah Parkington – strings and backing vocals

Guest musicians

- Bruce Springsteen – guest vocals on "Peg O' My Heart"
- Pat Lynch – guest vocals on "The Irish Rover"
- Fat Mike – guest vocals on "Going Out in Style"
- Chris Cheney – guest vocals on "Going Out in Style"
- Lenny Clarke – guest vocals on "Going Out in Style"
- Emma Casey – violin and backing vocals
- Joe Gittleman – additional backing vocals
- Jen Clarke – additional backing vocals
- Liam Casey – additional backing vocals
- Evan Tolonan – additional backing vocals
- Kevin Rheault – additional backing vocals

== Charts ==
Chart performance
Chart (2011)	Peak position
Australian Albums (ARIA)	26
Austrian Albums (Ö3 Austria)	33
Belgian Albums (Ultratop Flanders)	45
Belgian Albums (Ultratop Wallonia)	65
Canadian Albums (Nielsen SoundScan)	28
Dutch Albums (Album Top 100)	50
Finnish Albums (Suomen virallinen lista)	45
German Albums (Offizielle Top 100)	19
Irish Albums (IRMA)	54
Irish Independent Albums (IRMA)	9
Norwegian Albums (VG-lista)	32
Scottish Albums (Official Charts)	67
Swedish Albums (Sverigetopplistan)	18
Swiss Albums (Schweizer Hitparade)	38
UK Albums (Official Charts)	85
UK Independent Albums (Official Charts)	8
US Billboard 200	6
US Independent Albums (Billboard)	2
US Indie Store Album Sales (Billboard)	3
US Top Alternative Albums (Billboard)	2
US Top Rock Albums (Billboard)	2
