= Spirits (The Devil Makes Three album) =

Studio album by the Devil Makes Three
- Released: February 28, 2025
- Studio: Dreamland Recording Studios
- Genre: Americana
- Length: 45:37
- Label: New West Records
- Producer: Ted Hutt

The Devil Makes Three chronology
Live at Red Rocks (2019)	Spirits (2025)

Singles from Spirits
- 1. "Spirits" Released: October 21, 2024; 2. "I Love Doing Drugs" Released: December 3, 2024; 3. "Ghosts Are Weak" Released: January 22, 2025

Professional ratings
Review scores
Source	Rating
PopMatters	8/10
Under the Radar	8/10
Americana UK	9/10

Spirits is the eighth studio album by American band the Devil Makes Three. It was released on February 28, 2025, through New West Records. The album was produced by Ted Hutt (Dropkick Murphys, Old Crow Medicine Show) and recorded at Dreamland Recording Studios in Hurley, NY. Spirits was the Devil Makes Three’s first studio album in seven years and followed their 2018 album Chains Are Broken.

== Writing and composition ==
The album consists of 13 tracks that explore themes of grief, mortality, and personal reflection. Frontman Pete Bernhard noted that the songs were influenced by the current turbulent world, addressing topics such as loss, addiction, and societal division, while emphasizing the band's resilience.

The title track, "Spirits", is deeply personal for Bernhard, who wrote it after losing his mother, brother, and childhood friend in a short period. The song reflects on those losses and the concept of maintaining a connection with the spirits of loved ones.

== Release ==
Spirits was released on February 28, 2025 in the US, with the title track "Spirits" acting as the lead single supporting the album release, released on October 31, 2024. A second single "I Love Doing Drugs" was released on December 3, 2024, and a third single "Ghosts Are Weak" on January 22, 2025. The fourth single “Poison Well” was released along with the album, as the album's focus track. The album was released digitally, on CD, and vinyl, with limited-edition red and blue vinyl options. Additionally, the band announced North American and European tour dates to support the album in 2025.

== Critical reception ==
Glide Magazine wrote that the band sounds "like Johnny Cash fronting The Cramps" on the album. Under the Radar highlighted the album's cohesion, writing "Spirits coheres beautifully, sequenced in a manner that takes you on a musical journey."

== Track listing ==
#	Song title	Length
1	"Lights on Me"	3:51
2	"Spirits"	3:38
3	"Ghosts are Weak"	3:08
4	"Half as High"	2:34
5	"Hard Times"	3:18
6	"The Devil Wins"	3:58
7	"The Dark Gets the Best of You"	4:34
8	"Fallen Champions"	3:54
9	"The Gift"	3:27
10	"Divide and Conquer"	2:42
11	"I Love Doing Drugs"	3:10
12	"Poison Well"	3:43
13	"Holding On"	3:37

== Personnel ==
=== The Devil Makes Three ===
- Pete Bernhard – Composer, Fender Jazz Bass, Guitar, Lead Vocals
- MorganEve Swain – Bass, Backing Vocals
- Cooper McBean – Fender Jazz Bass, Guitar, Backing Vocals

=== Additional musicians ===
- Stefan Amidon – Drums
- Ted Hutt – Mixing, Producer, Percussion
- Ryan Mall – Engineer, Mixing
- Dave Cooley – Mastering
