= Go Betty Go =

American pop punk band

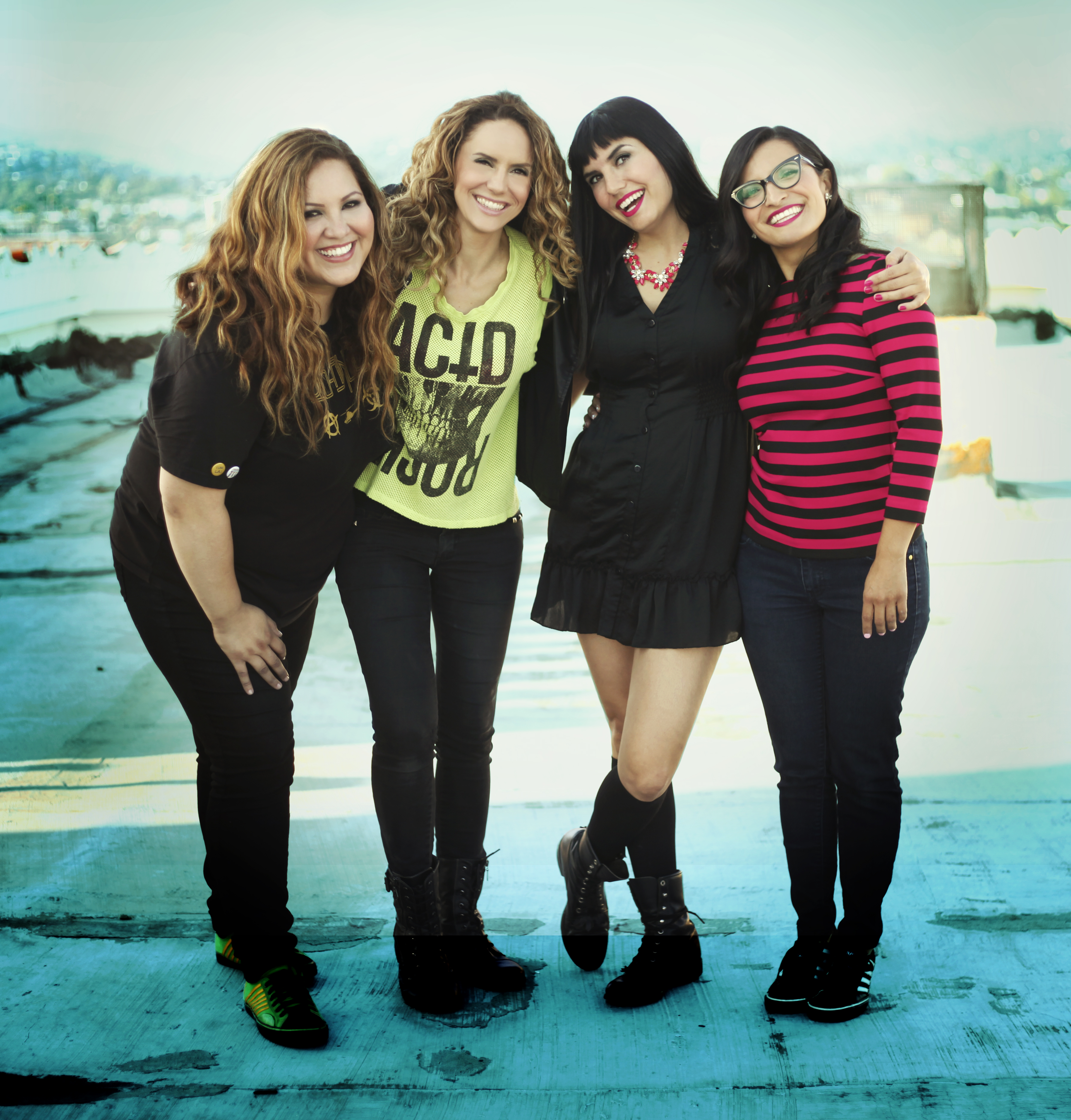
- Go Betty Go in 2014

Background information
- Origin: Glendale, California, United States
- Genres: Pop punk
- Years active: 1999–2010; 2012–present
- Label: SideOneDummy
- Members: Nicolette Vilar; Betty Cisneros; Aixa Vilar; Michelle Rangel
- Past members: Emily Wynne-Hughes White; Phil Buckman
- Website: Official website

Go Betty Go is an all-female pop punk band from Los Angeles that, along with bands such as Union 13, Los Abandoned, The Dollyrots, and Left Alone, have been prominent in the Southern California Chicano Punk scene that started in the mid-2000s and continues today.

== History ==
=== Early years ===
The band formed in Glendale, California in 2000 and originally consisted of Nicolette Vilar (lead vocals), Betty Cisneros (guitar), Aixa Vilar (drums), and Michelle Rangel (bass). Nicolette and Aixa are sisters of Argentinian descent. The name originates from a phrase the band used to chant to try to get guitarist, Betty Cisneros, to start a song.

The band released two CDs for SideOneDummy Records. The first was Worst Enemy in 2004. The second was Nothing Is More, produced by Flogging Molly’s Ted Hutt, in 2005. They also took part in the Warped Tours of 2004 and 2005.

=== Lineup changes ===
In February 2006, lead vocalist Nicolette Vilar left the band, causing them to cancel the end of their current tour. After holding auditions, in May 2006 a replacement was found in Emily Wynne-Hughes.

In August 2007, bassist Michelle Rangel posted an announcement on the band's web site stating that she was leaving the band. A replacement was found in Phil Buckman, who is currently playing bass with Fuel.

The band reunited with the original four band members in July 2012.

In April 2022, guitarist Betty Cisneros was diagnosed with Stage 4 cancer. Since then she has temporarily retired from touring, with Adam Bones taking her place as the touring guitarist.

=== Recent events ===
The original band reunited in 2012, and in 2015 independently released a new EP titled "Reboot" working again with 57th Annual Grammy Awards winning producer Ted Hutt, who produced all of their previous releases.

== Notability ==
They have received favorable attention in the press, such as:

- "The next Go-Gos Los Angeles music industry insiders are all abuzz about all-girl punk band Go Betty Go" (Indiana Gazette),
- "Nothing Is More showcases Go Betty Go as a versatile group able to swing effortlessly from speed-punk workouts to mellow ballads" (Milwaukee Journal Sentinel and San Antonio Express News),
- "One song they wrote during those sessions was I'm From L.A., which would become the Glendale band's anthem, a song so pouty, smart and rollicking it could fit in with the Go-Go's proud brand of earlier L.A. girl power" (Los Angeles Times),
- "they bang out the snappiest three-chord tunes around" (Newsweek),
- "A steady stream of club dates and prominent write-ups in L.A. Weekly and La Opinion have led to a spot on the testosterone-fueled Warped Tour and label deal with SideOneDummy Records." (Springfield News Leader),
- "head to the King King for that super hot girl group Go Betty Go" (Los Angeles Times) and
- "Similar hype should surround Go Betty Go after strong showings at Hard Rock Cafe and Emo's Annex" (St. Louis Post-Dispatch)
- "Punk Band Go Betty Go Are Back With Their First Release in a Decade" (L.A. Weekly)

Featured Works:

- Their single, "C'mon," from their The Worst Enemy EP was featured in the Burnout 3: Takedown video game.
- "I Go Towards You" was featured in the Canadian RomCom 'Home For Harvest' from 2019.
- They recorded an original song called "Very Very Rich Town" for The Sims 2: University, sung in the game's fictional language Simlish.

=== American Idol ===
In January 2009, the band's former lead vocalist, Emily Wynne-Hughes, auditioned for American Idol during its eighth season, where she sang "Barracuda". She passed the audition, but was eliminated during the Hollywood round.

== Band members ==
Current members

- Nicolette Vilar – lead vocals (1999–2006, 2012–present)
- Betty Cisneros – guitar, backing vocals (1999–present)
- Aixa Vilar – drums, backing vocals (1999–present)
- Michelle Rangel – bass, backing vocals (1999–2007, 2012–present)

Former members

- Emily Wynne-Hughes White – lead vocals (2006–2012)
- Phil Buckman – bass (2007–2012)

Touring members

- Sol Vigils – bass (2014–2017, touring substitute for Rangel)
- Adam Bones – guitar (2022, touring substitute for Cisneros)

== Discography ==
Studio albums

- Nothing Is More (2005)

Extended plays

- Worst Enemy (2004)
- Reboot (2015)
- Black & Blue (2024)

== See also ==
- Chicano rock
- Punk rock
- Rock en Español
- Mexican rock
