= Joyride (Transit album) =

Transit

Studio album by Transit
- Released: October 14, 2014 (U.S.)
- Genre: Alternative rock; pop rock; emo; indie rock; pop punk
- Label: Rise
- Producer: Gary Cioffi

Transit chronology
Young New England (2013)	Transit (2014)

Joyride is the fifth and final studio album from Boston-based band Transit released on October 21, 2014. It is the first and only album not to feature founding member, guitarist and backing vocalist Tim Landers, who departed the band during the recording process. In November, Transit supported Four Year Strong on their headlining US tour.

== Composition ==
Critics variously called the album alternative rock, pop rock, emo, indie rock, and pop punk.

== Track listing ==
All music is composed by Transit

No.	Title	Length
1.	"The Only One"	3:33
2.	"Saturday, Sunday"	3:52
3.	"Rest to Get Better"	3:25
4.	"Sweet Resistance"	2:59
5.	"Nothing Left to Lose"	3:20
6.	"Ignition & Friction"	3:03
7.	"Fine by Me"	3:19
8.	"Loneliness Burns"	3:11
9.	"Summer Dust"	3:01
10.	"Too Little, Too Late"	3:33
11.	"Pin and Needles"	3:33
12.	"Follow Me"	3:49
Total length:		40:38

== Personnel ==
Transit

- Ella Meadows - vocals
- Torre Cioffi - guitar, backing vocals
- P.J. Jefferson - bass
- Daniel Frazier - drums

Production

- Gary Cioffi - producer
- Steven Haigler - mix, master
