= Down on Deptford Broadway =

Studio album by Skinny Lister
- Released: 2015
- Recorded: Rockfield Studios Monmouth
- Genre: Folk, Folk Punk
- Label: Xtra Mile Recordings in the UK and Europe, Side One Dummy in the USA and Canada, and Uncle Owen Records in Japan.
- Producer: Ted Hutt

Skinny Lister chronology
Forge & Flagon (2012)	Down on Deptford Broadway (2015)	The Devil, The Heart & The Fight (2016)

Down on Deptford Broadway is the second album by London-based folk punk band Skinny Lister and takes its name from a short stretch of the A2 in Deptford south East London, and the surrounding area, with the phrase appearing as part of the lyric of the track "Six Whiskies".

The album was produced by Ted Hutt and engineered by Ryan Mall at Rockfield Studios during November 2013. It was mixed by Ted Hutt and Ryan Mall at Kingsize Sounlabs Los Angeles and mastered by Dick Beetham at 360 Mastering Hastings.

It was released in August 2014 in Japan, and 20 April 2015 in Europe and North America.

The album was available to pre-order in the UK from October 2014, with the track "Trouble on Oxford Street" available as an instant download. A video was made for this track which Clash Magazine declared as their track of the day on 20 November 2014.

== Track listing ==
All songs by Daniel Heptinstall. Music by Skinny Lister.

1. "Raise a Wreck"
2. "Trouble on Oxford Street"
3. "George's Glass"
4. "What can I say?"
5. "Cathy"
6. "Six Whiskies"
7. "This is War"
8. "Ten Thousand Voices"
9. "Bonny Away"
10. "Bold as Brass"
11. "This City"
12. "The Dreich"

== Personnel ==
=== Band members ===
- Dan Hepinstall - Lead vocals, guitar, piano
- Lorna Thomas - Lead Vocals
- Max Thomas - Melodeon, mandolin, vocals
- Andy "Slim" Black - Guitar, mandolin, vocals
- Michael Camino - Double bass, vocals
- Dave Neale - Drums

=== Additional musicians ===
- Roger Wilson - Fiddle
- Holly Cook - Penny whistle
- Marcus Wright - Piano
- Ted Hutt - Additional Guitar on 'Raise a Wreck'

=== Note ===
Due to line up changes during the eighteen-month delay between recording and release, the sleeve lists Sam Brace and Thom Mills as members of the band, with Andy Black and Dave Neale listed as additional musicians.

== Press and critical response ==
On 13 April, a week before the album was released The Guardian offered an exclusive stream of the album saying that the album "channels the riotous spirit of their beer-swilling live shows".

The London Evening Standard gave the album 4/5 Describing it as "... a giddy cross between The Pogues' swagger and, more obviously, The Men They Couldn't Hang's impassioned folk-soul advocacy for the mouthy underdog... It's hard to imagine a breakthrough into the mainstream, but it's harder to imagine anything more mischievous."

The NME gave the album 8/10 saying "These are boozing songs of love, conflict and elopement brewed from intoxicating hooks, so embrace your inner Pogue"
