= The Devil Makes Three (band) =

American music trio from Santa Cruz, California

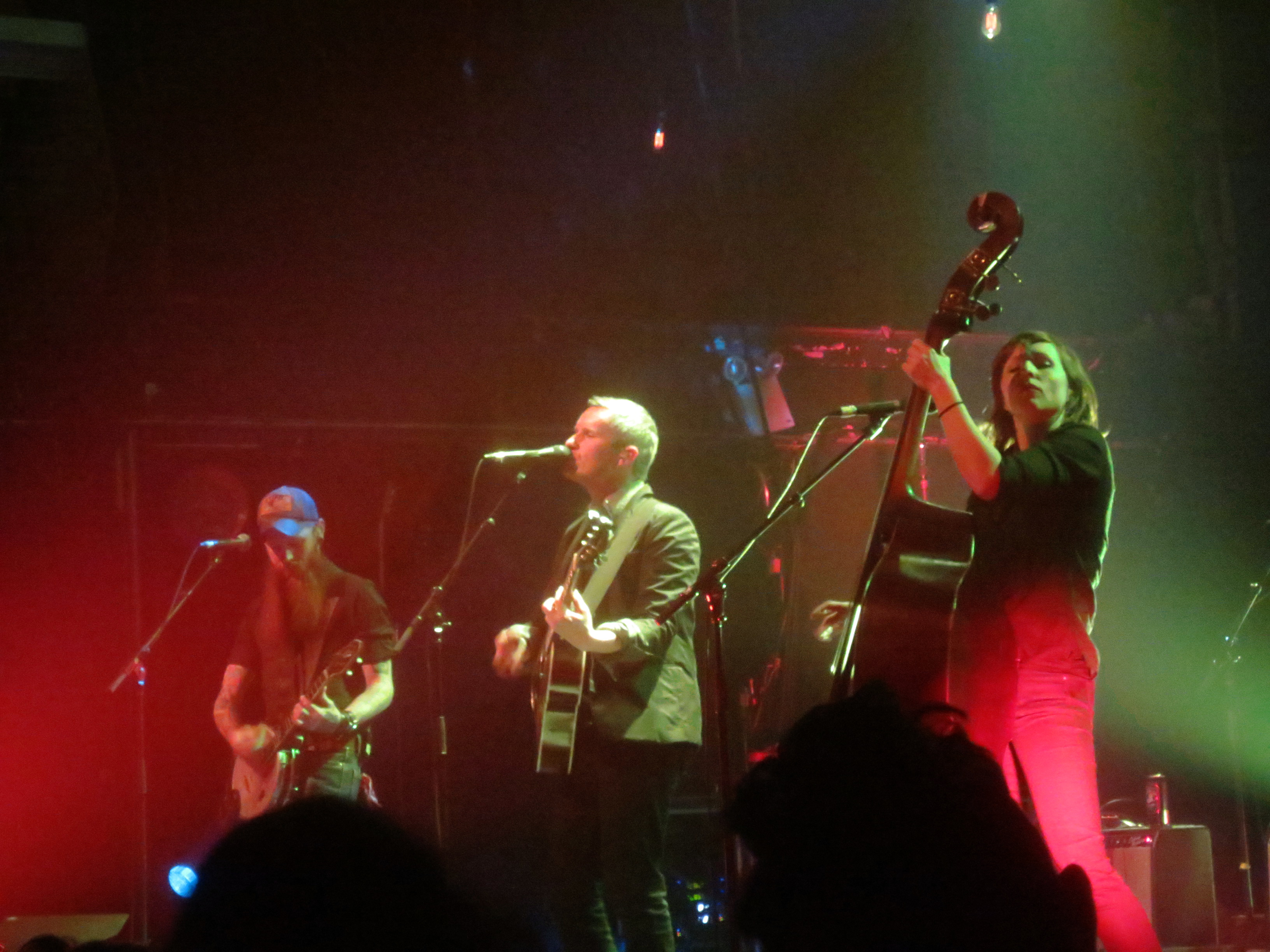
- The Devil Makes Three in 2016

Background information
- Origin: Santa Cruz, California
- Genres: Alternative country; old-time; Americana; bluegrass
- Years active: 2002–present
- Labels: Milan; New West; Monkeywrench; Khan
- Members: Pete Bernhard; MorganEve Swain; Cooper McBean
- Past members: Lucia Turino
- Website: thedevilmakesthree.com

The Devil Makes Three is an Americana band from Santa Cruz, California, United States. The group blends Americana, folk, bluegrass, old time, country, blues, jazz, punk and ragtime music. The group's current members are guitarist Pete Bernhard, upright bassist MorganEve Swain, and guitarist and tenor banjo player Cooper McBean. The band has released seven full-length studio albums and three live recordings.

== Career ==
=== 2002-2009 ===
Bernhard and McBean are originally from near Brattleboro, Vermont, where they played music together as childhood friends and when they were in high school. They were also acquainted with Lucia Turino (who was the band's original bassist and vocalist). Turino was from New Hampshire but raised in Vermont, but Bernhard and McBean didn't know her well. After graduating from high school, all three moved to California separately, Bernhard by way of Nashville. Bernhard and McBean re-connected in Olympia. Later in Santa Cruz they also became reacquainted with Turino, forming the band soon after in 2001. Before forming The Devil Makes Three with Turino, both Bernhard and McBean played in punk bands and later toured as a duo.

The band independently released a self-titled album in 2002. Another independent release followed in 2004, Longjohns, Boots, And A Belt. The band recorded two shows in April 2006 in Felton, California with guest fiddler Chojo Jacques. The recordings were later released as a live album, A Little Bit Faster And A Little Bit Worse.

After the release of their live album, the band signed with independent label Milan Records, which specializes in film scores and soundtracks. Their first album on Milan was a re-release of their debut album, The Devil Makes Three. In 2009, they followed with an all-new album, Do Wrong Right.

Band member Bernhard independently released a solo album, Things I Left Behind (2006). In September 2009 Bernhard released his next solo album, Straight Line, on Milan Records.

=== 2010-Present ===
Around 2010, Bernhard and Turino moved back to Brattleboro. McBean remained in California and later moved to Austin. Despite no longer living in the same town, the band continued to tour and write.

In August 2010, the band performed at Outside Lands Music and Arts Festival. They have also performed several times at the annual Hardly Strictly Bluegrass Festival.

On June 4, 2018, The Devil Makes Three announced their new studio album, Chains Are Broken, which was produced by Ted Hutt and released on August 24, 2018, via New West Records. Along with the album announcement, they released "Paint My Face" as a streaming single and released another album track, "Bad Idea", on July 13, 2018.

In 2019 Lucia Turino stepped back from performing live with The Devil Makes Three, and was replaced on the road by longtime collaborator MorganEve Swain (Brown Bird / The Huntress and Holder of Hands). On October 31, 2024, the band announced their first album in seven years, Spirits, set for release on February 28, 2025, via New West Records. Along with the announcement, the band premiered the title track, “Spirits”, and revealed the album's thirteen-song track listing. On December 3, 2024, the album's second single "I Love Doing Drugs" was released. The album was recorded by the new trio of Pete Bernhard, Cooper McBean and MorganEve Swain (taking over from Lucia Turino on upright bass and vocals).

== Discography ==
=== Albums ===
Title	Album details	Peak chart positions				
Title	Album details	US Grass	US	US Heat	US Indie	US Folk
The Devil Makes Three	Release date: November 1, 2002; Label: Monkeywrench	—	—	—	—	—
Longjohns, Boots, and a Belt	Release date: November 18, 2003; Label: The Devil Makes Three	—	—	—	—	—
A Little Bit Faster and a Little Bit Worse (Live recording)	Release date: November 17, 2006; Label: The Devil Makes Three	—	—	—	—	—
The Devil Makes Three (re-release)	Release date: November 20, 2007; Label: Milan	7	—	—	—	—
Do Wrong Right	Release date: April 21, 2009; Label: Milan	1	—	—	—	—
Stomp and Smash (Live recording)	Release date: October 24, 2011; Label: Milan	4	—	29	—	—
I'm a Stranger Here	Release date: October 29, 2013; Label: New West	2	124	2	22	9
Redemption & Ruin	Release date: September 16, 2016; Label: New West	1	144	2	11	8
Chains Are Broken	Release date: August 24, 2018; Label: New West	1	—	3	11	19
Live at Red Rocks	Release date: April 20, 2019; Label: Khan Records	3	—	—	—	—
Spirits	Release date: February 28, 2025; Label: New West	—	—	—	—	—
"—" denotes releases that did not chart

=== Music videos ===
Year	Video	Director
2013	"Stranger"	Malia James
