= City of Angels (2000 TV series) =

American medical drama television series

- Genre: Medical drama
- Created by: Steven Bochco; Paris Barclay; Nicholas Wootton
- Starring: Blair Underwood; Vivica A. Fox; Michael Warren; Hill Harper; Phil Buckman; Gabrielle Union; Maya Rudolph; Kyle Secor
- Opening theme: Performed by: Amy Keys (season 1); Brian McKnight (season 2)
- Country of origin: United States
- Original language: English
- No. of seasons: 2
- No. of episodes: 24 (1 unaired)

Production
- Executive producers: Kevin Hooks; Steven Bochco
- Running time: 44 minutes
- Production companies: Steven Bochco Productions; CBS Productions

Original release
- Network: CBS
- Release: January 16 – December 21, 2000

City of Angels is an American medical drama television series which ran for two seasons on CBS from January 16 to December 21, 2000. It was network television's first medical drama with a predominantly African American cast.

== Synopsis ==
The show centered on the professional and personal lives of the doctors and nurses at Angels of Mercy Hospital in Los Angeles, California. While the show brought about familiar faces (Vivica A. Fox, Blair Underwood and Michael Warren), it was a launching point for actors Hill Harper, Gabrielle Union and Maya Rudolph. The show was cancelled in December 2000.

== Cast ==
=== Main ===
- Blair Underwood as Dr. Ben Turner
- Vivica A. Fox as Dr. Lillian Price (season 1)
- Michael Warren as Ron Harris
- Hill Harper as Dr. Wesley Williams
- Phil Buckman as Dr. Geoffrey Weiss
- T. E. Russell as Dr. Arthur Jackson
- Viola Davis as Surgical Nurse Lynette Peeler
- Maya Rudolph as Nurse Grace Patterson (season 1; recurring season 2)
- Robert Morse as Edwin "Ed" O'Malley (season 1; recurring season 2)
- Gabrielle Union as Dr. Courtney Ellis (season 2)
- Gregory Alan Williams as Dr. Nathan Ambrose (season 2)
- Kyle Secor as Dr. Raleigh Stewart (season 2)

=== Recurring ===
- Tamara Taylor as Dr. Ana Syphax
- Harold Sylvester as Wendell Loman

== Episodes ==
=== Season 1 (2000) ===
No. overall	No. in season	Title	Directed by	Written by	Original release date	Prod. code
1	1	"Prototype"	Paris Barclay	Story by : Steven Bochco & Nicholas Wootton & Paris Barclay; Teleplay by : Steven Bochco & Nicholas Wootton	January 16, 2000	B101
An elderly woman refuses to have surgery because she is her grandchildren's guardian; inexperienced Dr. Weiss performs a surgery without consent.
2	2	"Oscar de la Boya"	Rick Wallace	Story by : Steven Bochco & Nicholas Wootton & Paris Barclay; Teleplay by : Dianne Houston & Jonathan R. Hiatt	January 19, 2000	B102
Dr. Price deals with her unresolved feelings for Dr. Turner; Dr. Williams' personal prejudices risk the life of a patient.
3	3	"Weenis Between Us"	Paris Barclay	Story by : Steven Bochco & Nicholas Wootton & Paris Barclay; Teleplay by : W.W. Vought	January 26, 2000	B103
Dr. Price intervenes when a drug addict fails to care for her children; Dr. Turner clashes with a renowned surgeon; Dr. Weiss asks nurse Patterson on a date.
4	4	"The High Cost of Living"	Kevin Hooks	Story by : Steven Bochco & Nicholas Wootton & Paris Barclay & Dayna Kalins; Teleplay by : Harold Sylvester	February 2, 2000	B104
Dr. Turner must evaluate his own religious beliefs when a family decides whether or not to continue life support for a loved one; Dr. Prince avoids a risky surgery; Edwin is blackmailed.
5	5	"The Prince and the Porker"	Joe Ann Fogle	Nicholas Wootton & Paris Barclay	February 9, 2000	B105
Dr. Price discovers that a boy is living without parental supervision; Dr. Prince sets out to ruin Dr. Williams' career; Dr. Weiss meets nurse Patterson's family.
6	6	"Unhand Me"	Clark Johnson	Story by : Steven Bochco & Nicholas Wootton; Teleplay by : Jonathan R. Hiatt	February 16, 2000	B106
Nurse Walker is injured when she approaches a man attacking a woman; an important organization visits Dr. Price and Ron Harris.
7	7	"Ax and Ye Shall Receive"	Rick Wallace	Story by : Steven Bochco & Dayna Kalins; Teleplay by : Harold Sylvester	March 1, 2000	B107
A perfectly coherent man comes in with a hatchet lodged in his skull; Dr. Price and Ron Harris complete their tour with Jayko.
8	8	"Cry Me a Liver"	Michael Schultz	Story by : Steven Bochco; Teleplay by : Dianne Houston	March 8, 2000	B108
Ron Harris hires a prostitute to help win a lawsuit against the hospital; the doctors engage in a court battle over who will get an organ transplant.
9	9	"Assume the Position"	Paris Barclay	Story by : Steven Bochco; Teleplay by : Nicholas Wootton & W.W. Vought	March 15, 2000	B109
A white police officer physically and verbally abuses Dr. Turner during a traffic stop; Dr. Price and Ron Harris argue over how to spend a grant from the city.
10	10	"Deliver the Male"	Rick Wallace	Story by : Steven Bochco & Dayna Kalins; Teleplay by : Harold Sylvester & Jonathan R. Hiatt	March 22, 2000	B110
Dr. Price reaches out to a gang member; Dr. Williams has an unusual patient; nurse Patterson's father refuses to have surgery.
11	11	"When Worlds Colitis"	Reginald Hudlin	Story by Steven Bochco & Dianne Houston	March 28, 2000	B111
A senior staff member finds out he is no longer needed and takes his own life; Dr. Turner befriends a homeless man who thinks he is a king.
12	12	"To Halve or Halve Not"	Kevin Hooks	Teleplay by Dianne Houston, Harold Sylvester & Jonathan R. Haitt Story by Steven Bochco & Harold Sylvester	March 29, 2000	B112
Dr. Price learns a devastating secret about her ex-husband; Dr. Williams accuses Dr. Turner of being jealous.
13	13	"Dress for Success"	Dianne Houston	Story by : Steven Bochco; Teleplay by : Nicholas Wootton & Jonathan R. Hiatt	April 5, 2000	B113
An athlete, destined for the NFL, faces permanent paralysis after an automobile accident; Ed O'Malley overdoses on pain medication; Ron Harris arranges a private surgery for himself.

=== Season 2 (2000) ===
No. overall	No. in season	Title	Directed by	Written by	Original release date	Prod. code
14	1	"Leg Erie"	Kevin Hooks	Nicholas Wootton & Jonathan R. Hiatt	October 12, 2000	B201
The nurses refuse to work overtime and night shifts following a series of rapes at the hospital; Dr. Turner faces a malpractice suit; the staff tries to adjust to the new medical director.
15	2	"Jerque Du Soleil"	Reginald Hudlin	Harold Sylvester	October 19, 2000	B202
The search for a serial rapist continues; the hospital may settle the malpractice suit filed against Dr. Turner.
16	3	"Bride and Prejudice"	Bill Duke	Dianne Houston	October 26, 2000	B203
A world-renowned surgeon's arrogance and insults burst the bubble of the hospital staff, who were eagerly awaiting his impending arrival.
17	4	"A Farewell to Arm"	Rick Wallace	Charles Murray	November 2, 2000	B204
With the serial rapist still on the loose, the nurses stage a sick-out that virtually paralyzes the hospital.
18	5	"Straight Flush"	Nick Gomez	Jonathan R. Hiatt	November 9, 2000	B205
Dr. Turner bears the brunt of a risky decision to perform a mastectomy against the will of higher-ups; Dr. Williams' personal belongings turn up missing.
19	6	"Nathan's Hot Dog"	Unknown	Story by Steven Bochco & Dianne Houston Teleplay by Harold Sylvester & Jonathan R. Hiatt	November 16, 2000	B206
While under a great deal of pressure, Dr. Chanley performs a life-altering operation on the wrong patient.
20	7	"The Lone Free-Ranger"	Greg Beeman	Story by Steven Bochco & Dianne Houston Teleplay by Dianne Houston	November 30, 2000	B207
A terminally ill 17-year-old patient asks Dr. Turner to delay surgery until he is 18 so that he, and not his parents, can make important decisions.
21	8	"Saving Faces"	Rick Wallace	Nicholas Wootton	December 7, 2000	B208
A mysterious disease threatens Dr. Turner, who, deep in despair, begins to write his last will and testament; Dr. Ellis takes matters into her own hands.
22	9	"Smoochas Gracias"	Dianne Houston	Harold Slyvester & Jonathan R. Haitt	December 14, 2000	B209
Dr. Turner finally recovers from his mysterious illness and can attend the Christmas party, which holds a few romantic surprises.
23	10	"SWAT's Happening"	Kenneth Fink	Jonathan R. Haitt & Harold Sylvester	December 21, 2000	B210
A gun battle erupts when gang members burst into the emergency room to finish off a rival, taking doctors and patients hostage in the terrifying process.
24	11	"Pick and Roll Over"	Rick Wallace	Nicholas Wootton	Unaired	B211
