= DJ Speedsick =

American experimental musician and record producer

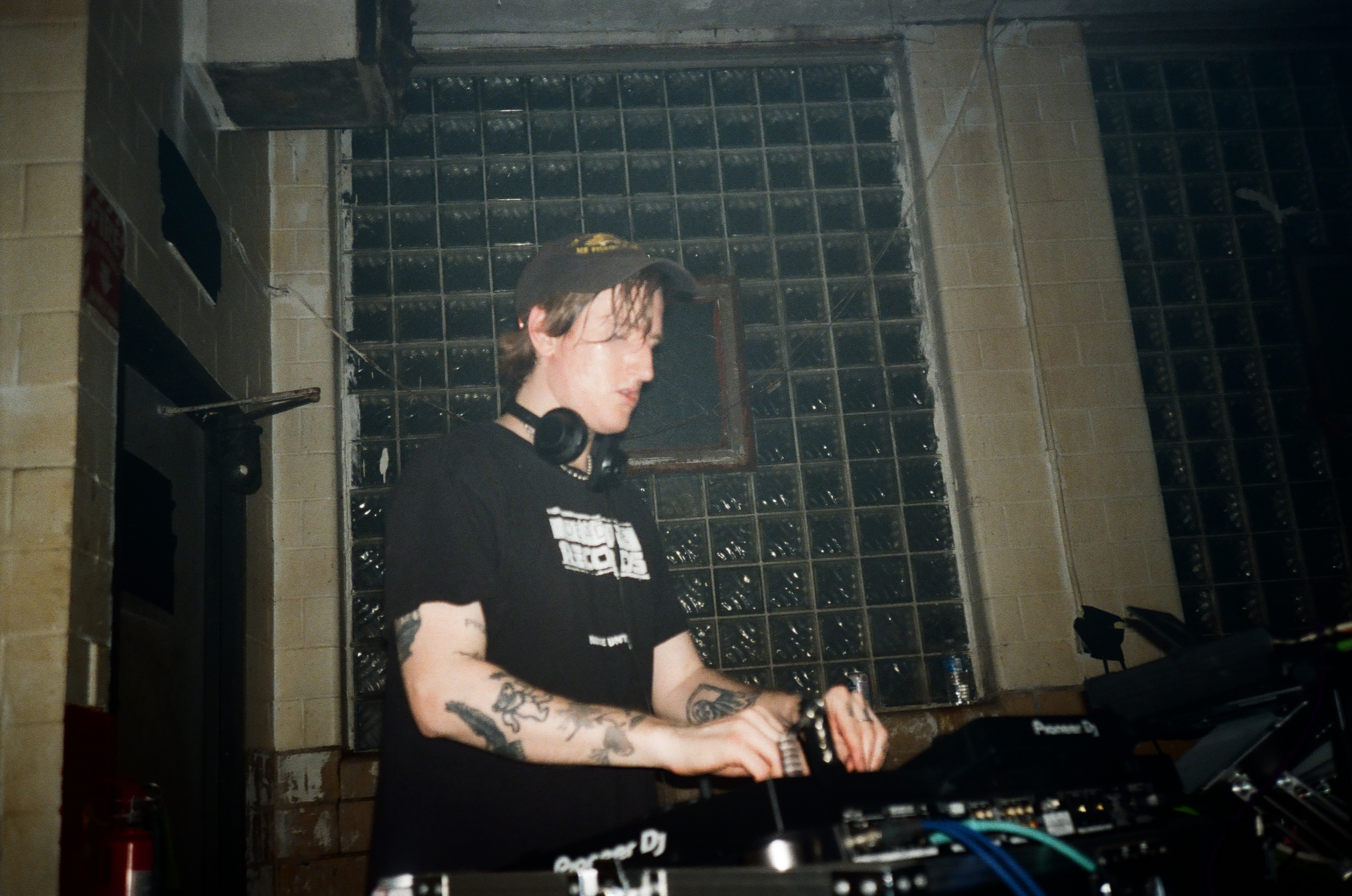

Background information
- Born: Alec Eberhardt; November 9, 1992 (age 33); Brookfield, Wisconsin, U.S.
- Origin: Chicago, Illinois, USA
- Genres: techno - industrial - noise hardcore - musique concrète
- Occupations: Musician; DJ; Producer
- Years active: 2016–present
- Label: Bank Records NYC RRRecords

DJ Speedsick is an American electronic musician, DJ, and record producer based in Chicago, Illinois. Emerging from the experimental music scene in the late 2010s, his work gained attention for its abrasive sound and role in a revival of interest in high-BPM/hardcore techno.

He has created scores for fashion campaigns by brands such as G-Star. He has shared bills with artists such as FKA Twigs, Yves Tumor, Regis, and Lil Ugly Mane.

== Early life and education ==
Speedsick was born in Brookfield, Wisconsin. He graduated from Arrowhead High School in Hartland, Wisconsin, in 2011, and later attended Columbia College Chicago from 2011-2015, earning a bachelor's degree in film and video.

== Career ==
=== 2017-2018: Early releases ===
DJ Speedsick debuted in 2017 on Austin-based label Breathing Problem Productions with the album Odyssey '97 on, a five-song release featuring a contrast of harsh instrumental industrial music and noise. His sophomore effort N.Y.S.S., containing three lengthy electronic noise pieces, was released later that year by Brooklyn label Dead Gods, followed by a reissued alternate version of his debut entitled Spiral '07. 2018 saw the release of Death Trip '17, along with the establishment of his own label, Snake Eyes & Sevens, with the EP In Trances.

=== 2019-2020: Breakthrough ===
In January 2019, he released the album Nothing Lasts through the Brooklyn-based label Bank Records NYC. The album was acclaimed within underground and independent music circles and credited with helping define the sound of a new generation of electronic musicians.

In 2020, he released Blood Mixed With Shit Mixed With Blood through the Berlin-based label Psychic Liberation, Electromagnetic Chauvinism through American noise label Fusty Cunt, Midwest Death Trance through Lobster Theremin's sublabel Techno Is the Devil's Music, and returning to Breathing Problem Productions with 777, a three-cassette compilation of unreleased earlier material.

=== 2021-2023: Later output, and fashion ventures, scoring ===
2021 saw the release of a split 12" record with Berlin-based producer Buttechno entitled "Spectres" on his Psy X Records imprint, distributed by Juno Records.

In 2024, he collaborated with London-based director Jordan Hemingway on scores for advertising campaigns by fashion brands including Acne Studios, Maison Margiela, and G-Star. That year also saw the release of Recycled on RRRecords, Execution Style on Pure Hate, Satanic Connection Between UNIX® and the Underworld, and No Exit, a digital release featuring raw guitar and drum sounds.

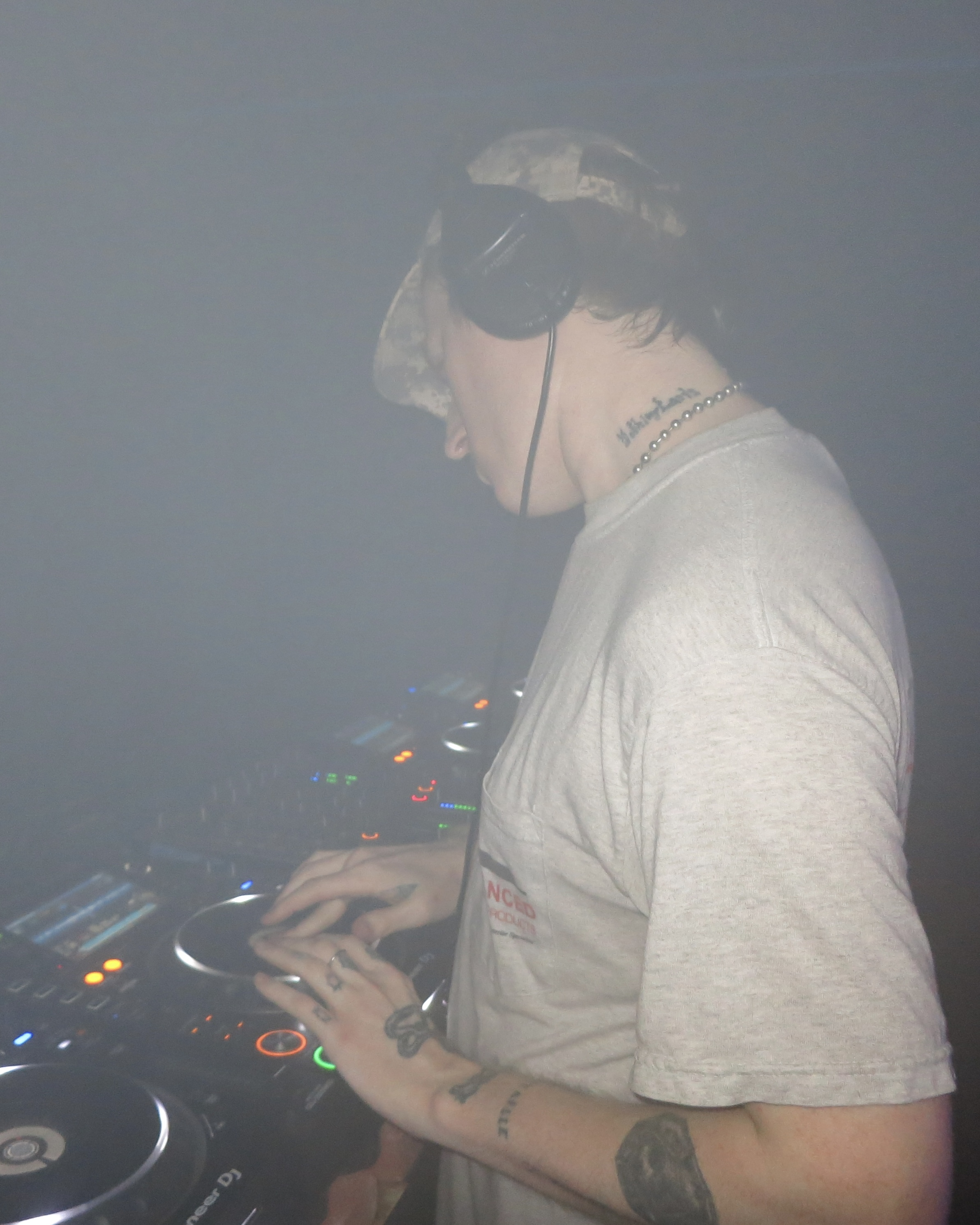
DJ Speedsick performing in San Francisco, CA, June 2025

In 2025, he performed as the opening act for two sold-out Chicago dates of FKA Twigs' Eusexua Tour at The Salt Shed. He composed his debut feature-length film score for the 2026 indie found footage horror film Compliance, directed by Kyle Mangione-Smith and starring Lindsey Normington.

=== Live appearances ===
Throughout his career, he has performed both DJ sets and Live PAs for concert appearances with artists such as FKA Twigs, Lil Ugly Mane, Regis, Yves Tumor, and Usurp Synapse.

== Style ==
DJ Speedsick's music is commonly described as techno, hardcore, industrial, noise music, power electronics, and musique concrète, often highlighted for its raw, cathartic aggression and analog, "old school" sonic quality achieved from the use of analog hardware and recording to cassette.

== Personal life ==
He currently resides in Chicago, Illinois.

== Selected Discography ==
Year	Title	Label	Format	Notes
2017	Odyssey '97	Breathing Problem Productions	Cassette	Debut release
2017	Spiral '07	Breathing Problem Productions	Cassette	
2017	N.Y.S.S.	Dead Gods	Cassette	
2018	Death Trip '17	Breathing Problem Productions	Cassette	
2019	Nothing Lasts	BANK Records NYC	Cassette	
2019	Dance with the Devil	BANK Records NYC	Cassette 12" Vinyl	
2020	7 7 7	Breathing Problem Productions	Cassette	3 x cassette anthology
2020	Blood Mixed with Shit Mixed with Blood	Psychic Liberation	CD	
2020	Electromagnetic Chauvinism	Fusty Cunt	Cassette	
2020	Turn Illness into a Weapon	Ophism	12" Vinyl Cassette	
2021	Snake Pit LSD	DNA Records	Cassette	
2022	Spectres	PSY X Records	12" Vinyl	split with Buttechno
2022	Midwest Death Trance	Techno Is The Devil's Music	12" Vinyl	
2023	Concrete Hell EP	self-released	Digital	
2023	temp_eeeb7dc_.DS_Store	self-released	CD-R	
2023	Faces.Of.Death.1978.VHSRip.XviD-DJSS.nfo	self-released	CD-R Cassette	DJ mix
2024	Satanic Connection Between UNIX® And The Underworld	Escalationist	CD-R	
2024	Deathamphetamine II: Back In The Pit	Total Black	Cassette	
2024	Execution Style	Pure Hate	12" Vinyl	
2024	No Exit	self-released	Digital	
2024	Recycled	RRRecords	Cassette	Part of the "Recycled Music" series
2025	Scant / DJ Speedsick – Split	Breathing Problem Productions	12" Vinyl	split with Scant
