= The Alps (band) =

English indie London-based band

- Origin: Greenwich, London, England
- Genres: Indie
- Years active: 2005–2009
- Labels: Elusive Musc (owned by The Alps)
- Members: Daniel Heptinstall; Sam Brace; David Edwards; Hezi Yechiel
- Past members: Dan Gray

The Alps were an English band from Greenwich, London. They released six singles and one album, with the sixth single 'Obstacle Race' appearing in Spring 2009. The band's debut album, Something I Might Regret, was produced by Dave Allen and released on 10 March 2008.

The Alps operated their own record label 'Elusive Music', were self-managed and oversaw most of their business internally. The band toured extensively including playing at the Reading Festival in 2005. In 2009 Heptinstall, Brace and Gray formed the Folk punk band Skinny Lister.

== Members ==
- Daniel Heptinstall (lead vocals, guitar)
- Sam 'Mule' Brace (vocals, guitar, keyboard)
- David Edwards (Original bass guitar)
- Dan 'with a tash' Gray (bass guitar)
- Hezi Yechiel (drums)

== Discography ==
=== Singles ===
Year	Song	UK Singles Chart	Album
2005	"World at War"	-	
2006	"Last Dance"	-	
2007	"Hunted and Haunted"	-	
2008	"Something I Might Regret"	-	
2008	"Not So Laughable Now"	-	
2009	"Obstacle Race"	-	
