= Nothing Lasts Forever =

Nothing Lasts Forever may refer to:

== Film and Television ==
- Nothing Lasts Forever (film), a 1984 film
- Nothing Lasts Forever (documentary), a 2023 Showtime documentary about the diamond industry
- "Nothing Lasts Forever" (Lucifer), a 2021 TV episode
- "Nothing Lasts Forever" (The X-Files), a 2018 TV episode

== Fiction ==
- Nothing Lasts Forever (Sheldon novel), a 1994 novel by Sidney Sheldon, adapted for a 1995 TV miniseries
- Nothing Lasts Forever (Thorp novel), a 1979 novel by Roderick Thorp, basis for the film Die Hard

== Music ==
=== Albums ===
- Nothing Lasts Forever (Defiance album) or the title song, 1998
- Nothing Lasts Forever (Tribe of Gypsies EP) or the title song, 1997
- Nothing Lasts Forever (Coldrain EP), 2010
- Nothing Lasts Forever (And It's Fine), by Flora Cash, 2017
- Nothing Lasts Forever (Teenage Fanclub album), 2023

=== Songs ===
- "Nothing Lasts Forever" (Echo & the Bunnymen song), 1997
- "Nothing Lasts Forever" (Jebediah song), 2002
- "Nothing Lasts Forever" (The Living End song), 2006
- "Nothing Lasts Forever", by Maroon 5 from It Won't Be Soon Before Long, 2007
- "Nothing Lasts Forever", by Bananarama from Pop Life, 1991 (unreleased)
- "Nothing Lasts Forever", by the Early November from Imbue, 2015
- "Nothing Lasts Forever", by the Kinks from Preservation Act 2, 1974
- "Nothing Lasts Forever", by Natalia Kills from Perfectionist, 2011
- "Nothing Lasts Forever", by Ride from Tarantula, 1996
- "Nothing Lasts Forever", by Sam Hunt from Southside, 2020
- "Nothing Lasts Forever", by Transit from Young New England, 2013
- "Nothing Lasts Forever", by Who's Who from Ulterior Motives (The Lost Album), 2024
