= Phil Buckman =

American musician and actor

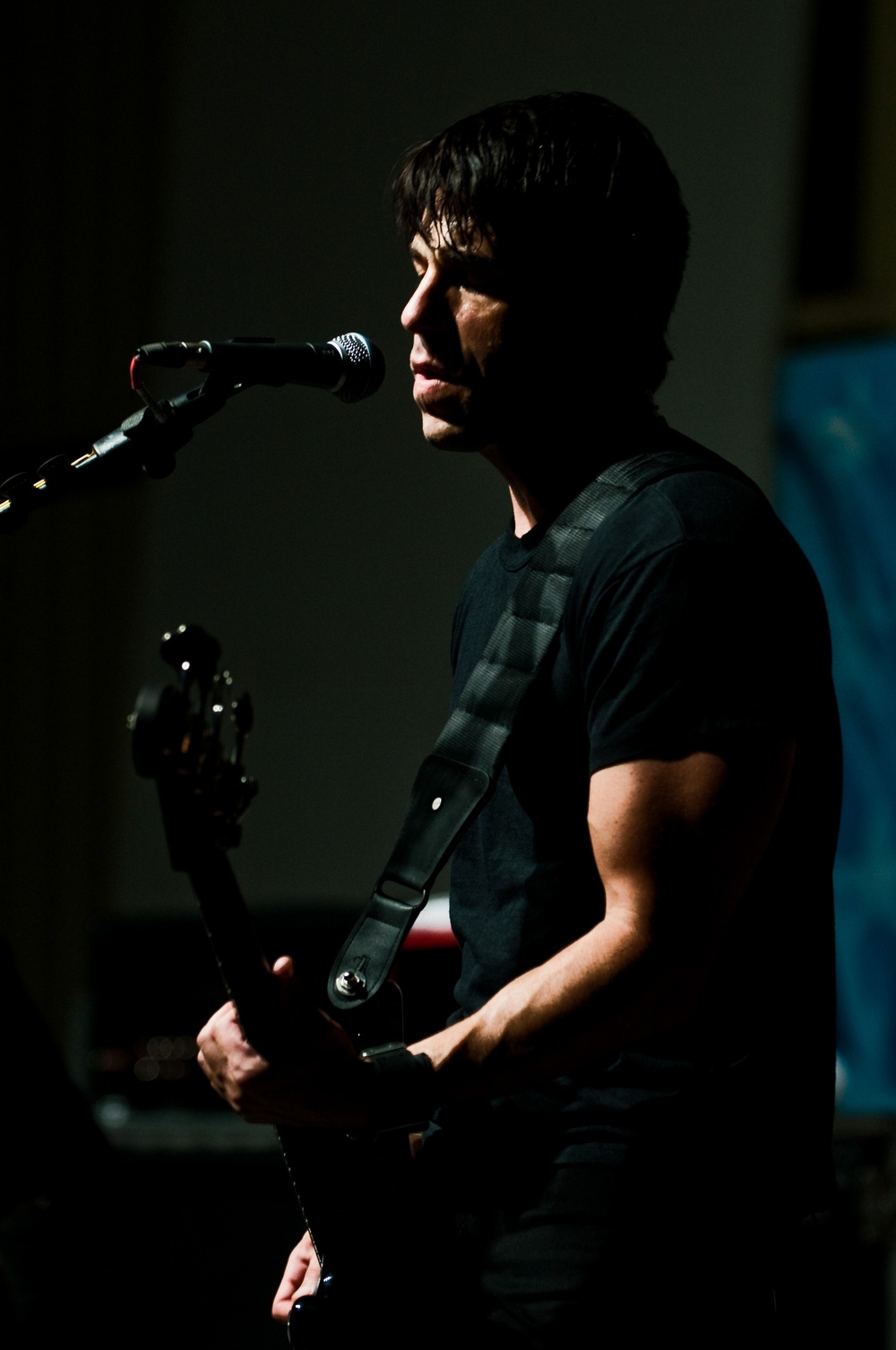
- Buckman performing in 2010

Background information
- Born: Philip Bradley Buckman; November 18, 1969 (age 56); Queens, New York, U.S.
- Occupations: Bassist; actor
- Years active: 1990–present
- Formerly of: Filter; Fuel
- Spouse: Lauren Tarantino (m. 2014)

Philip Bradley Buckman (born November 18, 1969) is an American musician and actor. He was the bassist for the rock band Filter from 2010 to 2013 for Fuel from 2015 to 2021.

== Early life ==
Originally from Queens, New York, Phil Buckman arrived in Los Angeles after living in Baltimore and Boston, and attending college in San Diego. While attending San Diego State University, he was a member of Theta Chi fraternity, Gamma Theta chapter.

== Career ==
=== Music ===
Buckman made a name for himself in the L.A. music scene as the bassist for the band Tribal Sex Cult. Upon the demise of T.S.C., Phil kept busy with a wide variety of projects including Texture (Vital Recordings), Helicopter Helicopter, (Initial Records), FINE (Flip Records), Kill the Complex, and The Snow (Northern Lights) as well as contributing to various film and television soundtracks. Other bands he has been associated with include Onesidezero (Maverick), vOLUMe, THE iMPOSTERS (Interscope), and Go Betty Go (sideonedummy). He is the former bassist for the industrial rock band Filter, the alternative rock band Fuel, the rock band Steel Panther, and is currently the bassist for Petty Cash (Tom Petty/Johnny Cash tribute band).

=== Acting ===
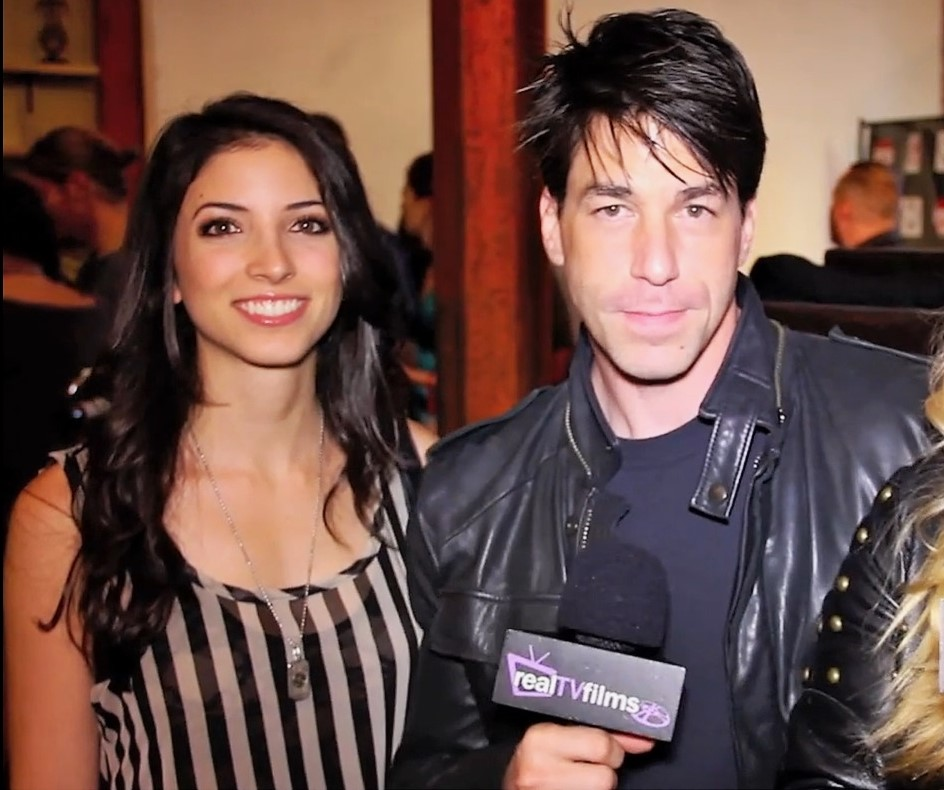
Buckman (right) and Lauren Tarantino being interviewed in 2012

Buckman has an extensive career as a voiceover, television and film actor. As an actor, he had series regular roles on such television shows as Drexell's Class (FOX), Daddy's Girls (CBS), City of Angels (CBS), Bob Patterson (ABC), and Boston Public (FOX). He recently has been seen on the shows Matlock (CBS), The Pitt (HBO/MAX), Mom (CBS), Schooled (ABC), Broke (CBS), The Resident (FOX), and Secret Lives Of College Escorts (Lifetime).

For the past 3 years, he has been the main announcer voice of ColoGuard, and ColoGuard+ TV commercials, and was the voice of all television and radio commercials for the Carl's Jr./Hardee's restaurant chains from 2000 to 2011. After a year away from the restaurant's commercials, Buckman was asked to come back, and was the voice of both chains for an additional 5 years. He has also done voiceover work for Yamaha motorcycles and ATVs, the World of Warcraft video game, and countless promos for ABC, CBS, NBC, Adult Swim, and MSG.

== Selected filmography ==
- Matlock (2026) as Father Patrick Cassidy
- The Pitt (2025) as Tom
- The Resident (2022) as Jimmy Miller
- Broke (2020) as Nick Murray
- Marvel Heroes (2013) as Ghost
- Boston Public (2004) as Henry Preston
- Bob Patterson (2001) as Vic
- California Dreams (TV series) (1992) as Sheldon
- City of Angels (2000) as Dr. Geoffrey Weiss
- Clubland (1999) as Paul
- King of the Hill (1999) as Chad
- Zoe (1999) as Lonnie
- Matters of Consequence (1999) as Joe
- An American Werewolf in Paris (1997) as Chris
- Beverly Hills, 90210 (1997) as Devin Taggert
- A Very Brady Sequel (1996) as Jason
- Frasier (1994) as Leo
- Weird Science (1994–1996) as Roger Pizzone
- The Great White Hype (1996) as Lee
- Daddy's Girls (1994) as Scar
- Sister, Sister (TV series) (1994) as Deadhead
- Grace Under Fire pilot (TV series) (1993) as babysitter's boyfriend
- Wings (1993) as Carter
- Married... with Children (1992) as Joe
- Drexell's Class (1991–1992) as Slash
- Beverly Hills, 90210 (1991) as Surfer Dude
- Days of Our Lives (1990) as Larry
