= Skinny Lister =

British folk band

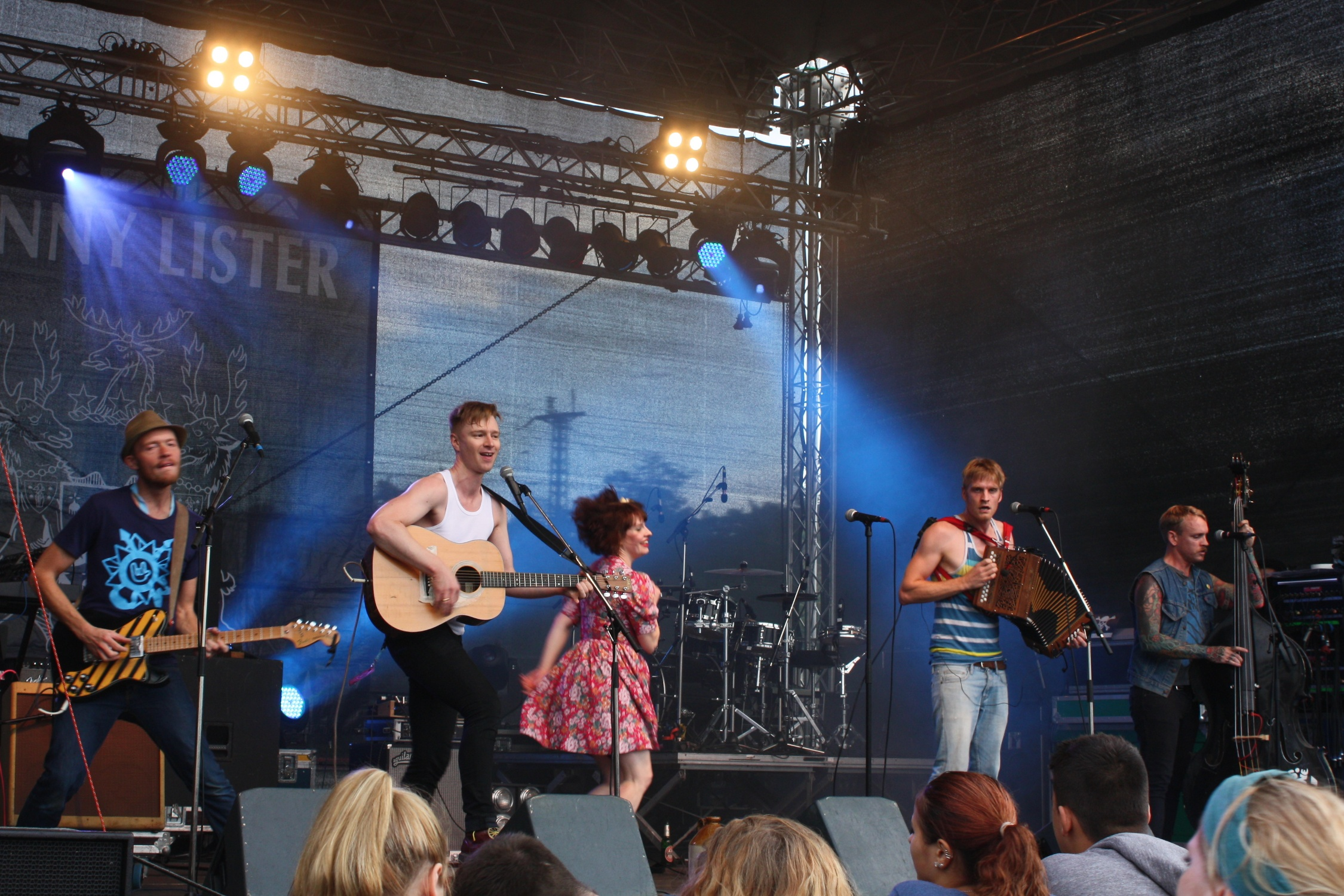
- Skinny Lister in Wiesbaden, Germany 2013

Background information
- Origin: Greenwich, London, England
- Genres: Folk; indie folk; folk punk; indie rock; indie pop; punk rock
- Years active: 2009–present
- Labels: Imperial Music; Sunday Best Recordings; Side One Dummy; Uncle Owen; Xtra Mile Recordings
- Members: Daniel Heptinstall; Lorna Thomas; Maxwell Thomas; Scott Milsom; Tim Hillsdon
- Past members: Dan Gray; Dave Neale; Andy "Slim" Black; Michael Camino; Sam Brace; Thom Mills
- Website: www.skinnylister.com

Skinny Lister are a British band formed in London in 2009. They were a five-piece band until October 2013 when a drummer was added. In August 2022 they returned to being a five-piece after Sam Brace left and the decision was made not to replace him. They are signed to Xtra Mile Recordings, and were previously signed to Sunday Best Records in the UK, SideOneDummy Records in the US, and Uncle Owen Records in Japan.

== Career ==
=== Origins ===
The band were formed in London in 2009 having met through folk clubs in Greenwich. Prior to forming Skinny Lister, Dan Heptinstall, Sam Brace and Dan Gray had played together in Indie band The Alps. The band name is usually said to be taken from the nickname of someone Dan Heptinstall was at school with.

Dan Gray left the band in the summer of 2012 and was replaced with Michael Camino from Hawaii, US. In the spring of 2013 Sam Brace left the band and was replaced by Andy "Slim" Black; he later rejoined. In the autumn of 2013 the band expanded to a six-piece with the addition of drummer Dave Neale.

=== Early years and Forge and Flagon: 2009–2013 ===
During their first year the band put three tracks on iTunes – "Plough & Orion", "December", and "The Kite Song".

During 2010 the band put out a two CD-only EPs: Grand Union EP which was recorded on a canal boat as they toured down the Grand Union Canal network and the Homemade Tour EP recorded at friends and family residences as the band toured their hometowns.

In 2011, the band played more festivals than anyone else in UK and were officially crowned 'Hardest Working Band in UK' by PRS and less officially by the Evening Standard.

Skinny Lister appeared at SXSW at the beginning of 2012 and then staged a short tour of the US in April. During this time they auditioned for SideOneDummy Records and Kevin Lyman in Los Angeles, California in the record label's car park and were immediately offered a place on the 2012 Vans Warped Tour. The band signed up and appeared playing three times a day much to audience delight and critical acclaim, Rolling Stone highlighting the band in a review of the tour.

On return from the United States the band scheduled a number of dates in Germany including Haldern Pop and Reeperbahn Festival in Hamburg, and a UK tour in October to coincide with the release of double AA side single, "Forty Pound Wedding" and "Seventeen Summers". Before the band left for the US, they appeared on Terry Wogan's Sunday morning BBC Radio 2 show.

In 2013, Skinny Lister started the year with a tour of Germany in January and then immediately flew to the US to join Flogging Molly on the first half of their annual Green17 Tour. The band also appeared at SXSW 2013 and played Coachella as well as a number of other major festivals internationally during the summer of 2013.

Their debut album Forge & Flagon was released in June 2012 in the UK and Europe January 2013 in the US and July 2013 in Japan.

=== Line up changes and Down on Deptford Broadway: 2012–2015 ===
Between 2012 and 2014 Skinny Lister went through a number of line up changes. At the end of August 2012 Dan Gray left and was replaced by Michael Camino who the band had met on the Vans Warped Tour.

In April 2013 Sam 'Mule' Brace left the band and was replaced by Andy 'Slim' Black, who made his debut with the band at South by South West in Texas.

In the autumn of 2013, the band expanded to a six-piece by adding Dave Neale on drums. This six-piece line up toured Britain and Germany in the autumn of 2013 before going into the studio to record the band's second album, Down on Deptford Broadway.

Skinny Lister's second album was recorded at Rockfield Studios in December 2013 and was released on 20 April 2015. It was produced by Ted Hutt.

The band began 2014 with a tour of the US supporting Dropkick Murphys and a tour of the UK supporting Boy George. They then toured the US and played a number of UK festivals during the summer.

Drummer Dave Neale left to concentrate on another project and suggested his replacement Thom Mills. Mills made his debut on the Boy George Tour, but Neale chose the last night of that tour as his final gig with the band.

On 16 September 2014 it was announced that the band had signed to Xtra Mile Recordings and that the second album would be out in spring 2015.

On 17 September 2014, Andy Black left the band by mutual consent and was replaced by his predecessor Sam Brace.

During October 2014 the band played a short tour of Japan, followed by a tour of five English cities where they played the new album in its entirety for the first time. The first single from the album Trouble on Oxford Street was released in January 2015. A video for the song was made available on 20 November 2014.

In the autumn of 2015 Skinny Lister supported Frank Turner in the US and UK. In January 2016 they supported him in Germany.

On 20 November 2015 Skinny Lister released "This Christmas", a collaboration with Xtra Mile Recordings labelmate Beans On Toast with proceeds going to Homelessness charity Shelter.

In March 2016 the band played on Flogging Molly's "Salty Dog" cruise, they also headlined a short tour of the eastern USA supported by Beans On Toast and Will Varley.

=== The Devil, the Heart and the Fight: 2016–2017 ===
In May 2016 the band went into The Silk Mill Studio in Newcastle Under Lyme with producer Tristan Ivemy to record their third album. On 23 July the band announced via social media and their website that the album was to be called The Devil, the Heart, and the Fight, and would be released on 30 September. The announcement was accompanied by a video for the first single from the album, entitled "Wanted".

On 27 September, three days before the album's official release the NME website carried a feature and full stream.

The album release was followed by tours of the UK and the US. The London date on this tour was given a 5/5 review by National newspaper The Independent.

The album entered the UK Indie Album Chart at number 38.

In early 2017, Michael Camino took time off to recover from an ankle injury, and in March, he announced that he would not return from his time off, and was leaving the band. Scott Milsom of Coffin Nails and Big Boss Man had filled in for Camino on a European tour supporting Dropkick Murphys, and was then announced as a permanent replacement when Michael Camino's departure was announced.

In October 2017 a deluxe edition of The Devil, the Heart, and the Fight was released with a second disc containing three completely new songs, some live recordings, some different versions of existing songs, and what is described as "band chat" introducing different sections of the second disc.

=== The Story Is: 2017–2019 ===
During 2017 in interviews and social media Q&A sessions the band hinted that a fourth album would be released in the spring or summer of 2018. In July 2017 the band returned to Rockfield Studios and have also spent time in other studios. It is likely that the new songs on the deluxe version of The Devil, the Heart, and the Fight were recorded in these sessions, but it is not known how much other material has also been recorded.

Between late June and late September 2018 photos on the band's Instagram account showed them in Blue Bell Hill Studio near Chatham recording the fourth album. This was also stated in a blog post on the band's official website.

On 31 October 2018 the bands various social media accounts announced that the album would be called The Story is... and would be released on 1 March 2019. The announcement also included dates for the UK and European legs of a World Tour.

The album was produced by Barny Barnicott and has been described as "A loosely-based concept album, The Story Is… anthologises a series of personal vignettes inspired by a chaotic few years for the band and binds them into 14 tracks of unmistakably Skinny-sounding rock’n’roll."

The band began 2019 with the third single from the still forthcoming album My Distraction described as being "... about being so obsessed with something that everything else falls by the wayside. When only one thing is in focus and everything else is merely background noise. Even though written initially with broader meaning, the lyrics are particularly fitting for our current fixation with modern technology and, even more particularly, our tethering of ourselves to our smart phones."

They toured Europe in March and April, followed by a tour of the US in May. The US tour included support slots with The Bouncing Souls and an appearance at Frank Turner's Lost Evenings III Festival in Boston, as well as headline dates. The band later toured the UK in December.

=== A Matter of Life and Love: 2020–2022 ===
Even before the COVID-19 pandemic, 2020 had been planned as a quiet year due to Lorna's pregnancy, and the birth of her daughter (with Dan) in March of that year. The band was due to have some festival appearances in the summer and a UK tour in the run up to Christmas. No dates had been officially announced at the time of their cancellation.

In October the band released a Fifth Anniversary Edition of Down on Deptford Broadway on yellow vinyl with download codes for demo versions of the twelve tracks. The launch of this included a live Q&A session on Facebook where it was hinted that new songs had been written and were being recorded.

Some of the festival appearances and the UK tour postponed from the end of 2020 will take place in 2021.

On 10 December the band released a video on YouTube for a new single "Shout it Out" which was available to stream and download the following day.

During 2021 two further singles were released. "Bavaria Area" and "Damn the Amsterdam" and the band announced the release in October of their fifth studio album A Matter of Life and Love

In early August 2022 the band posted on their social media that Sam Brace and Thom Mills had both left the band and that the previous evening's performance at Wickham Festival was their last. Further Social Media posts later in the month announced that Tim Hillsdon, who had been a stand in drummer with the band several times that year, would be joining as the new permanent drummer, and that they would continue as a five-piece without replacing Sam Brace.

=== Shanty Punk: 2023 ===
In October 2023 Skinny Lister released their sixth album Shanty Punk, preceded by the singles "Down on the Barrier," "Company of the Bar," and "Mantra." The album was met with positive reviews, with Distorted Sound Magazine giving it an 8/10 and saying it "[embodies] everything we know and love about Skinny Lister."

== Personnel ==
The band was originally a five-piece, expanding to a six-piece in the autumn of 2013 and reverting to a five-piece in August 2022 after having played a number of dates through the year with the new line up as a temporary measure.

=== Current members ===
- Dan Heptinstall – lead vocals, guitar, and stomp box (July 2009–present)
- Max Thomas – melodeon, mandolin and vocals (July 2009–present)
- Lorna Thomas – vocals, ukulele (July 2009–present)
- Scott Milsom – double bass, bass guitar and vocals (January 2017–present)
- Tim Hillsdon – drums (August 2022–present)

=== Former members ===
- Dan Gray – double bass, vocals (2009– August 2012)
- Dave Neale – drums (October 2013 – March 2014)
- Andy "Slim" Black – guitar, mandolin and vocals (April 2013 – 17 September 2014)
- Michael Camino – double bass and vocals (October 2012 – March 2017)
- Thom Mills – drums (March 2014 – August 2022)
- Sam "Mule" Brace – guitar, concertina, vocals (July 2009 – March 2013, September 2014 – August 2022) mandolin (2014–2022)

== Discography ==
=== Albums ===
- Forge & Flagon (2012)
- Down on Deptford Broadway (2014)
- The Devil, the Heart and the Fight (2016)
- The Story Is... (2019)
- A Matter of Life & Love (2021)
- Shanty Punk (2023)
- Songs from the Yonder (2025)

=== EPs ===
- Home Made Tour EP (2010)
- Grand Union EP (2010)
- Forty Pound Wedding EP (2012)
- On These Rotten Streets My Best Days Have Been Spent EP (2014)
- Pub Shed Bootleg [Live] (2024)

=== Singles ===
- Plough & Orion (2009)
- December (2009)
- Kite Song (2010)
- Plough & Orion / If the Gaff Don't Let Us Down (2012)
- Colours / Rollin' Over (2012)
- Trouble on Oxford Street (2015)
- Cathy (2015)
- This Is War (2015)
- This City (2015)
- Six Whiskies (2015)
- This Christmas (2015) – Collaboration with Beans On Toast
- Wanted (2016)
- Geordie Lad (2016)
- The Devil in Me (2016)
- Thing Like That (2018)
- 38 Minutes (2018)
- The Story Is... (2018)
- Shout It Out (2020)
- Bavaria Area (2021)
- Damn the Amsterdam (2021)
- Down on the Barrier (2023)
- Company Of The Bar (2023)
- Mantra (2023)
- Set Us Straight (2024)
