= Listen & Forgive =

Studio album by Transit
- Released: October 4, 2011
- Recorded: Mid-2011
- Studio: Maximum Sound, Danvers, Massachusetts
- Genre: Emo, alternative rock
- Length: 34:25
- Label: Rise
- Producer: Gary Cioffi

Transit chronology
Keep This to Yourself (2010)	Listen & Forgive (2011)	Young New England (2013)

Professional ratings
Review scores
Source	Rating
AbsolutePunk	85%
Alter the Press!	3/5

Listen & Forgive is the third studio album by American pop punk band Transit.

== Background ==
Listen and Forgive was the band's first release with Rise Records, with whom they signed in December 2010. It was revealed that the band were in the process of writing their next album, planned for release in the fall. In March and April 2011, the band went on tour with Senses Fail. Following this, the band made an appearance at Bled Fest in May. While expressing their interest to open for Patrick Stump's solo show in 2011, they felt that their music was not suitable to open for Stump, and instead brought Stump aboard to feature on "All Your Heart".

Listen & Forgive was written and recording in mid-2011 at Maximum Sound Studios in Danvers, Massachusetts; Gary Cioffi served as producer for the sessions and handled recording alongside Thomas Iannello. Cioffi and Iannello contributed string arrangements to the recordings. Phil Dubnick did additional editing, prior to the album being mixed and mastered by Steven Haigler at Vu Du Studios in Port Jefferson, New York.

== Release ==
In July, the group supported Bayside on their headlining US tour. Listen & Forgive was released on October 4, 2011. In October and November, the band supported Saves the Day and Bayside on their co-headlining US tour. To coincide with the tour, the groups each contributed one track to a four-way split single. Transit's contribution was "The Answer Comes in Time". In December, the band supported Four Year Strong on their brief holiday tour dubbed It's a Wonderful Gig Life. In March and April 2012, the band supported the Wonder Years on the Glamour Kills Spring 2012 tour in the US. To promote the tour, a compilation album was released that featured the bands covering one of the other bands' songs. Transit's contribution was a cover of the Polar Bear Club track "Resent and Resistance". In October, the band supported Lower Than Atlantis on their headlining UK tour.

== Track listing ==
Track listing per booklet.

No.	Title	Length
1.	"You Can't Miss It (It's Everywhere)"	2:38
2.	"Long Lost Friends"	3:34
3.	"Listen & Forgive"	2:38
4.	"All Your Heart"	3:21
5.	"Asleep at the Wheel"	2:47
6.	"Cutting Corners"	2:37
7.	"Skipping Stone"	3:33
8.	"I Think I Know You"	3:15
9.	"Don't Make a Sound"	2:56
10.	"1978"	3:06
11.	"Over Your Head"	4:00
12.	"The Answer Comes in Time"	3:38

2012 Reissue
No.	Title	Length
1.	"I Told You So"	4:14
2.	"Skipping Stone" (Alt. version)	3:35
3.	"You Can't Miss It (It's Everywhere)"	2:38
4.	"Long Lost Friends"	3:34
5.	"Listen & Forgive"	2:38
6.	"All Your Heart"	3:21
7.	"Asleep at the Wheel"	2:47
8.	"Cutting Corners"	2:37
9.	"Skipping Stone"	3:33
10.	"I Think I Know You"	3:15
11.	"Don't Make a Sound"	2:56
12.	"1978"	3:06
13.	"Over Your Head"	4:00
14.	"The Answer Comes in Time"	3:38
15.	"Forgive Forget Space (For Future Reference)"	4:09

== Personnel ==
Personnel per booklet.

Transit

- PJ Jefferson – bass
- Daniel Frazier – drums
- Ella Meadows – vocals
- Torre Cioffi – guitar, vocals
- Tim Landers – guitar, vocals

Additional musicians

- Gary Cioffi – string arrangements
- Thomas Iannello – string arrangements

Production and design

- Gary Cioffi – producer, recording
- Thomas Iannello – recording
- Phil Dubnick – additional editing
- Steven Haigler – mixing, mastering
- Michael Glockner – photography
