= Nothing Lasts (album) =

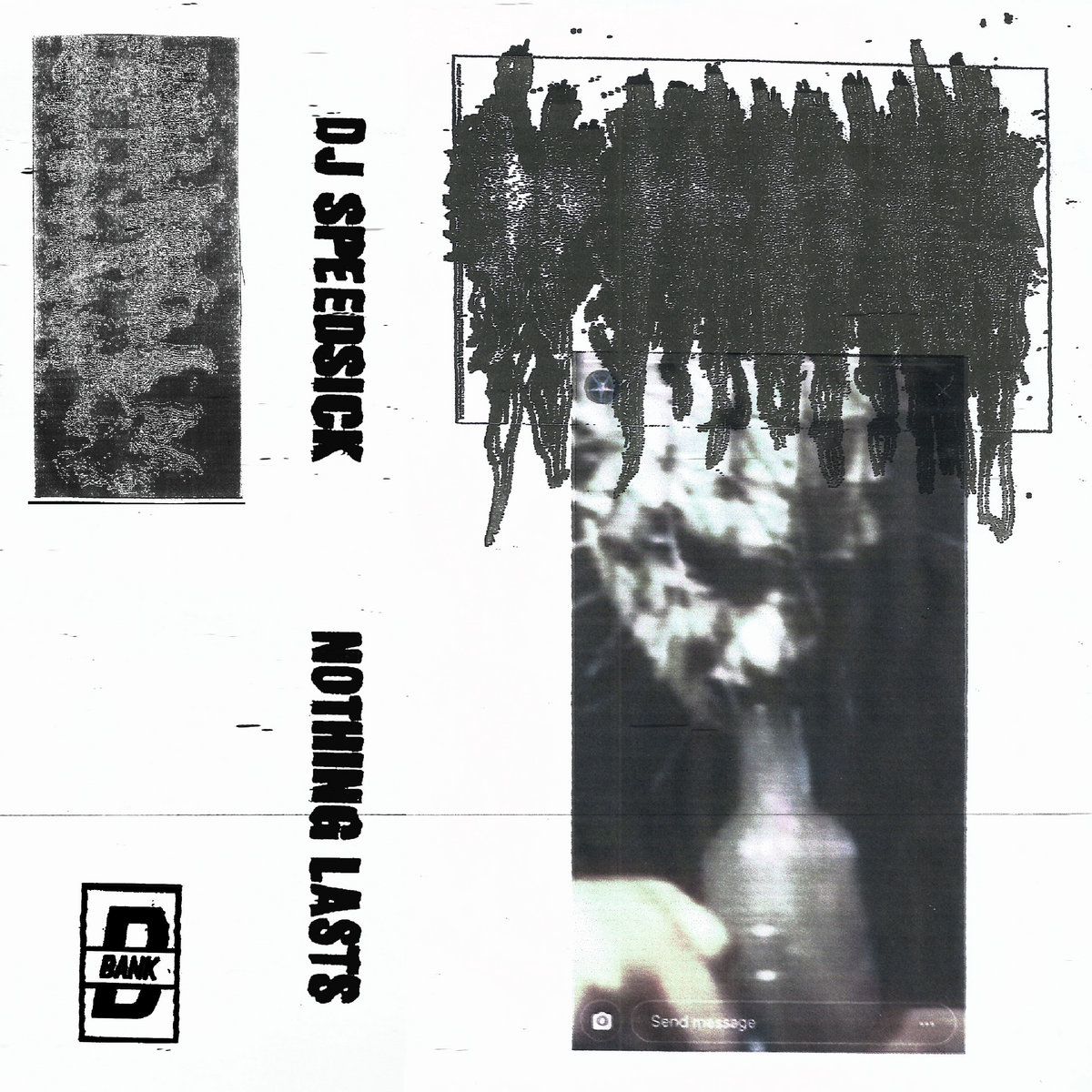
- Original cassette cover

Studio album by DJ Speedsick
- Released: January 2019
- Recorded: Fall 2016 – Spring 2017
- Genre: Techno; industrial; hardcore; free tekno
- Length: 42:29
- Label: Bank Records NYC
- Producer: DJ Speedsick

DJ Speedsick chronology
| In Trances (2018) | Nothing Lasts (2019) | Dance With The Devil (2019) |

CD cover
- Cover of latest CD version

Nothing Lasts is the debut studio album by American electronic musician DJ Speedsick, released in January 2019 through Brooklyn-based label Bank Records NYC.

== Background and release ==
Nothing Lasts was recorded in Chicago, Illinois, and Madison, Wisconsin, between Fall 2016 and Spring 2017. The album was mastered by Niko Zaglaras, with insert photography by Sandy Witte and layout by Speedsick. It was released in January 2019 on cassette and digital formats through Bank Records NYC, marking DJ Speedsick's first release on the label and representing the most consistently techno-oriented of his early works.

== Musical style ==
The album opens with an intro that samples a 1994 video interview with Kurt Eckes and Woody McBride of Drop Bass Network at the infamous Midwestern rave Even Furthur, establishing thematic references to rave history that bookend the album.

The album's sound has been described as techno, hardcore, and industrial techno, noted for its raw quality, abrasiveness, and cathartic energy. Tone Madison described the production as using "bare-bones drum samples, a haze of distorted static, and volatile synth patches" to create "angrily driving dance tracks that slip around in the leakage of a troubled unconscious."

Specific tracks such as "Death Trips" were noted for pitting "a wobbling bass against a rigid kick drum, resulting in a viscerally queasy rhythmic friction," while "Head Full of Hate and Acid" features "snarled oscillations" and "maniacally high-tempo beat[s]." The album closes with "Even Furthur Down the Spiral," described as "a densely kinetic weave of percussion and warped bass that feels almost contemplative."

== Reception ==
The album was widely acclaimed within underground and independent music circles. It was credited with helping define the sound of a new generation of electronic musicians, while drawing renewed interest in dance music from other scenes such as punk and metal. Bandcamp Daily called it a work that "offers the psychic equivalent of rolling around in lead tailings," praising Speedsick for greeting "the listener with foulness and alienation at just about every turn" while doing so "in a spirit of frantic creativity."

The album appeared on several year-end lists for 2019, including Duplication.ca's "Best Cassettes of 2019," Vice's "Stream of the Crop: 11 New Albums for Heavy Rotation," Tone Madison's "Top 20 Madison Records of 2019," and Reckless Records' 2019 Employee Best of List.

== Track listing ==
| No. | Title | Length |
|---|---|---|
| 1. | "Intro" | 0:50 |
| 2. | "Death Trips" | 8:18 |
| 3. | "Soviet Clone" | 4:02 |
| 4. | "No Euphoria (Russian Ghetto Version)" | 5:57 |
| 5. | "Head Full of Hate and Acid" | 10:00 |
| 6. | "North Side LSD" | 5:30 |
| 7. | "Even Furthur Down the Spiral" | 7:50 |
| Total length: | | 42:29 |
