= Young New England =

Studio album by Transit
- Released: April 2, 2013
- Recorded: December 2012
- Studio: Maximum Sound
- Genre: Pop punk, emo, indie rock, alternative rock
- Length: 45:29
- Label: Rise
- Producer: Ted Hutt

Transit chronology
Listen & Forgive (2011)	Young New England (2013)	Joyride (2014)

Professional ratings
Review scores
Source	Rating
AbsolutePunk	5/10
AllMusic	3/5 stars
Sputnikmusic	4/5 stars

Young New England is the fourth studio album by pop punk band Transit.

== Production ==
Young New England was recorded at Maximum Sound Studios in Danvers, Massachusetts in December 2012. Ted Hutt produced the sessions, with additional production from Gary Cioffi on "Hang It Up" and "Hazy". Cioffi also served as the engineer; John Delloiacono did additional engineering. Cioffi mixed the album, before it was mastered by Nathan James at The Vault Mastering Studios.

== Release ==
It was released on April 2, 2013, through Rise Records. In October and November, the band supported Taking Back Sunday on their headlining US tour. In April and May 2014, the band supported Mayday Parade on their So Devastating, It's Unnatural Tour in the US. Following this, the group supported Man Overboard on their headlining North American tour in May and June, dubbed The Heart Attack Tour.

== Track listing ==
All music and lyrics by Transit.

No.	Title	Length
1.	"Nothing Lasts Forever"	2:41
2.	"Second to Right"	3:14
3.	"Young New England"	3:50
4.	"Sleep"	3:12
5.	"So Long, So Long."	3:49
6.	"Weathered Souls"	3:40
7.	"Hang It Up"	3:16
8.	"Don't Go, Don't Stray"	3:32
9.	"Thanks for Nothing"	4:03
10.	"Summer, ME"	2:59
11.	"Hazy"	3:31
12.	"Bright Lights, Dark Shadows"	3:23
13.	"Lake Q"	4:19

== Personnel ==
Personnel per booklet.

Transit

- Ella Meadows – vocals
- Tim Landers – guitar, vocals
- Torre Cioffi – guitar, vocals
- PJ Jefferson – bass
- Daniel Frazier – drums

Production

- Ted Hutt – producer
- Gary Cioffi – additional production (tracks 7 and 11) engineer, mixing
- John Delloiacono – additional engineering
- Nathan James
- Troy David Millhoupt – art direction, design
- Dan Brenton – photography
