= Transit (band) =

American emo band

- Origin: Stoneham, Massachusetts, U.S.
- Genres: Emo; alternative rock; pop punk; power pop; indie rock; post-hardcore
- Years active: 2006–2016
- Labels: Barrett; Run for Cover; Mightier Than Sword; Rise
- Past members: Ella Amber Meadows; Torre Cioffi; P.J. Jefferson; Daniel Frazier; Joseph Lacy; Tim Landers

Transit was an American rock band from Stoneham, Massachusetts. From their formation in 2006 to their split in 2016, they released five albums, four EPs, and a split EP with Man Overboard. Although they largely took influence from emo acts such as Saves the Day, Death Cab for Cutie, American Football, Fairweather, Lifetime, and Hot Water Music their sound transformed from a fusion of pop punk and contemporary emo from their early releases into an indie rock sound by their final release, Joyride.

== Biography ==
In January 2007, Transit made a demo, two songs of which appeared on their Myspace profile. A few months later, "Shift On" and "Waterways in NE" were posted online prior to the release of Let It Out. "Rule of Nines" was posted online in December 2007, followed by "For the World" in January 2008. In July 2008, it was announced that the band would release a new EP, titled Stay Home, later in the year. On October 16, it was announced that the band had signed to independent label Run for Cover Records. Three days later, "Stay Home" was posted on the group's Myspace profile. At the end of the month, a music video was released for "Stay Home". In November, Run for Cover Records released a sampler which included "Nameless", a track from Stay Home, which was scheduled for release in January 2009. "Stay the Same" was posted on the band's Myspace on March 30, 2009; Stay Home was eventually released on April 14. In June and July 2009, they went on an East Coast tour, leading into an East Coast and Midwestern tour with Balance and Composure and Man Overboard. In December 2009 and January 2010, they went on a US tour with Make Do and Mend. Between May and July 2010, they went on a US tour with A Loss for Words, Kid Liberty, Fallen from the Sky, This Time Next Year and Such Gold. From mid-August to early October 2010, the band supported the Swellers on their tour of the US.

In 2011, Listen & Forgive reached No. 9 on the Billboard Heatseekers chart and No. 40 on the Independent Albums chart. After performing on the Ernie Ball Stage during Warped Tour 2012, they released Young New England, which reached No. 4 on the Billboard Heatseekers chart and No. 40 on the Independent Albums chart. Their follow-up record, Joyride, was released on October 21, 2014. On February 29, 2016, the band announced their breakup via Twitter. From April 19 to April 26, the band played a final "goodbye" tour, with their final show at The Sinclair in Boston, MA.

Former member Tim Landers died on February 2, 2019. In June 2023, lead singer Ella Amber Meadows (formerly known as Joe Boynton) came out as a trans woman via Instagram.

== Members ==
=== Final lineup ===
- Ella Amber Meadows – lead vocals (2006–2016)
- Torre Cioffi – guitar, vocals (2011–2016)
- P.J. Jefferson – bass, vocals (2006–2016)
- Daniel Frazier – drums (2006–2016)

=== Former ===
- Joseph Lacy – guitar, vocals (2006–2011)
- Tim Landers – guitar, vocals (2006–2014, died 2019)

=== Touring members ===
- Kevin Tse – guitar (2009)
- Brandon Wark – guitar (2014–2016)

== Discography ==
=== Albums ===
- This Will Not Define Us (Barrett, February 26, 2008 (CD & digital); Animal Style, May 7, 2009 (12" vinyl))
- Keep This to Yourself (Run for Cover, August 17, 2010)
- Listen & Forgive (Rise, October 4, 2011)
- Young New England (Rise, April 2, 2013) U.S. #193
- Joyride (Rise, October 21, 2014)

=== EPs ===
- Let It Out (Barrett, 2007)
- Stay Home - EP (Run For Cover, 14 April 2009 (CD & Digital); Barrett, 22 May 2010 (12" vinyl))
- Something Left Behind (Mightier Than the Sword, 22 February 2011)
- Futures & Sutures (Rise, 2 December 2013)

=== Splits ===
- Man Overboard/Transit - Split with Man Overboard (Pure Noise, 8 December 2009)

=== 7" ===
- Promise Nothing - 7" (Rise, April 25, 2011)
- For Future Reference - 7" (Rise, October 4, 2011)
- Skipping Stone - 7" (Rise, July 2012)
- Joyride Acoustic - 7" (Rise, October, 2014)

=== Singles ===
- "Nothing Lasts Forever" (Rise, 11 February 2013)

=== Music videos ===
- "Rule of Nines" (2008)
- "Stay Home" (2009)
- "Long Lost Friends" (2011)
- "Cutting Corners" (2011)
- "Asleep at the Wheel" (2012)
- "I Think I Know You" (2012)
- "Skipping Stone" (alternate version) (2012)
- "Nothing Lasts Forever" (2013)
- "Weathered Souls" (2013)
- "Young New England" (2013)
- "So Long, So Long" (Futures & Sutures sessions) (2014)
- "Rest to Get Better" (2014)
- "The Only One" (2015)
