= The Riptide Movement =

Irish rock band formed in Dublin

- Origin: Lucan, Dublin, Ireland
- Genres: Folk rock, Blues
- Years active: 2006–present
- Label: Universal Music
- Members: Seán McNulty; Malachy Tuohy; John Dalton; Gerry McGarry; Gar Byrne
- Website: Official site

The Riptide Movement are an Irish rock band formed in Dublin in 2006 by songwriter and vocalist Malachy Tuohy, guitarist John Dalton, bassist and harmonica player Gerry McGarry and drummer Gar Byrne.

== Members ==
- Seán McNulty, Lead Vocalist and founding member, ex Underworld enforcer, Bodyguard, Traveller rights activist
- Malachy Tuohy - Songwriter, lead vocals, guitar, piano.
- Gerry McGarry - Bass, harmonica, vocals.
- JPR Dalton - Lead guitar, vocals.
- Gar Byrne - Drums, percussion, vocals.

== Discography ==
The Riptide Movement discography
- Studio albums: 3
- Singles: 4

=== Studio albums ===
Year	Album details	Peak chart positions
Year	Album details	IRL
2009	What About The Tip Jars?: Released: 1 May 2009; Label: Lucan Music; Formats: CD, download	16
2012	Keep On Keepin' On: Released: 20 April 2012; Label: Independent; Formats: CD, download	6
2014	Getting Through: Released: 4 April 2014; Label: Universal Music; Formats: CD, download, vinyl	1
2016	Ghosts: Released: 21 October 2016; Label: Universal Music; Formats: CD, download	5
"—" denotes a title that did not chart.

== History ==
=== 2009 ===
"Early Years", "Green Tortoise", "Cold Wind Blows", "Downtown Motel" and "All My Thoughts" were all songs on their earliest E.P. After relocating to London, they began playing in venues such as The Spice Of Life, Lark in the Park, The Barfly, Dublin Castle and The 12 Bar. Whilst performing at the In The City Festival in Manchester, they encountered producer Tony Colton. Colton, who is known for his work with Rory Gallagher, Ray Charles, Yes and Heads, Hands and Feet, would later produce their début album, "What About The Tip Jars?"

=== Production of What About The Tip Jars? ===
What About The Tip Jars? was produced by Tony Colton; it was recorded over a two-year period; most of the recordings were done in Ireland, although some mixing was done in London and later some piano and B3 work was added in Nashville by Reese Wynam (The Allman Brothers Band, Stevie Ray Vaughan).

=== 2010–2011 ===
The band spend a lot of time touring, not only around Ireland but overseas in Germany, Czech Republic, England and Russia, whilst also recording in France. They first release single Hot Tramp on 20 September, which reaches number one on the Physical Singles Chart, and number twenty seven on the Irish Singles Chart. They release demo CD Hot Tramp which contains tracks such as Keep On Keepin' On, Hard To Explain, and Cocaine Cowboys, all of which become live staples, and make their way onto the second album.

=== 2012 ===
Second album Keep On Keepin' On is released on 20 April to great critical acclaim. It reached number six on the Irish Albums Chart, and major music retailer HMV sells out of copies within ten days of its release. The band begin a nationwide promotion tour and play numerous festivals, including Electric Picnic, Festival Of The Fires, Indiependence, Sea Sessions and Knockanstockan. This summer also saw the end of the band's tradition of busking, mainly on Grafton Street, as their schedule became too hectic.

On 17 October the band travelled to India to play a series of gigs as part of the Rendezvous Festival in New Delhi. This has been their furthest performance from home to date, and Hot Press magazine featured the tour in their Christmas Annual for the Most Unusual Gig Of The Year spot.

The 10 November saw the band play their largest headline show at the Olympia Theatre, Dublin where they played to a crowd of 1,300, before continuing their tour around Ireland.

=== 2013 ===
Following on the success of the previous Olympia gig, the band put on two more shows in Ireland in May, to sell out crowds, followed by another Irish tour before doing the festival scene in Europe, including Benicassim and Glastonbury. Later that year, the band played a series of concerts in the USA.

=== 2014 ===
The band signed a record deal with Universal Music in early 2014 ahead of the release date of their 3rd album Getting Through. The album was released on 4 April with a sell out album launch at Vicar Street. The following week the album reached number 1 in the charts. The album features the hit single All Works Out that stars actress Amy Huberman in a video for the song. On 5 May 2014 the ad for Discover Ireland was launched featuring All Works Out', it also includes hit songs 'You & I' 'Animal' and 'Across the Water'.

Getting Through is a gold selling album in Ireland and was released globally in 2015.

=== 2016 ===
The band released their 4th studio album 'Ghosts' to critical acclaim, it was recorded in Sonic Ranch Studios in Texas, produced by Ted Hutt and it charted at 5 in the Official Irish album Charts. The album includes hit songs 'Elephant in the room' 'Changeling' and ' Scull and Crossbones'.

=== 2018 ===
The band released a 2 track EP called 'Plastic Oceans' featuring the songs 'Plastic Oceans' and ' What will the kids say?' Recorded in 'State of the Ark' studios in London and produced by Chris Coady.

=== 2019 ===
The band released their 6th studio record 'Something Special' to critical acclaim, it was recorded in Attica studios and co -produced by Tommy McLoughlin. The album includes hit songs 'I'll be there' 'Something Special' and 'Fall a little more in love'.
