= Chains Are Broken =

Studio album by the Devil Makes Three
- Released: August 24, 2018
- Studios: Sonic Ranch Studios, Tornillo
- Genres: Bluegrass; country; folk
- Length: 37:41
- Label: New West

The Devil Makes Three chronology
Redemption & Ruin (2016)	Chains Are Broken (2018)	Live at Red Rocks (2019)

Professional ratings
Aggregate scores
Source	Rating
Metacritic	81/100
Review scores
Source	Rating
AllMusic	4/5 stars
American Songwriter	3.5/5 stars
Exclaim	8/10
Paste	6.6/10
PopMatters	8/10

Chains Are Broken is the sixth studio album by American band the Devil Makes Three. It was released on August 24, 2018, through New West Records.

== Track listing ==
No.	Title	Length
1.	"Chains Are Broken"	3:18
2.	"Pray for Rain"	3:46
3.	"Paint My Face"	3:23
4.	"Can't Stop"	3:33
5.	"Need to Lose"	2:50
6.	"All Is Quiet"	5:04
7.	"Bad Idea"	2:58
8.	"Deep Down"	2:40
9.	"Native Son"	3:10
10.	"Castles"	3:17
11.	"Curtains Rise"	3:37

== Charts ==
Chart	Peak position
US Americana/Folk Albums (Billboard)	19
US Independent Albums (Billboard)	11
US Vinyl Albums (Billboard)	8
US Top Bluegrass Albums (Billboard)	1

== Personnel ==
The Devil Makes Three

- Pete Bernhard – Composer, Fender Jazz Bass, Guitar, Lead Vocals
- Lucia Turino – Bass, Backing Vocals
- Cooper McBean – Fender Jazz Bass, Guitar, Guitar (Baritone), Backing Vocals

Additional musician

- Stefan Amidon – Drums, Harmonium, Mellotron, Percussion, Piano, Backing Vocals
- Ted Hutt – Mixing, Percussion, Producer
- Ryan Mall – Engineer, Mixing
