= Michael Patrick MacDonald =

Irish-American activist and author (born 1966)

- Born: March 9, 1966 (age 60)
- Occupations: Activist; author
- Writing career
- Notable awards: American Book Award (2000)

Michael Patrick MacDonald (born on 9 March 1966) is an Irish American activist and crime author. His memoir, All Souls: A Family Story From Southie, is about his heritage and anti-violence. MacDonald helped start Boston's Gun-buyback program and set up the South Boston Vigil group, a local community group that works to honor Southie's victims of gun violence.

In 1999, he received the Daily Point of Light Award, honoring volunteer work. MacDonald has also been awarded an Anne Cox Chambers Fellowship at the MacDowell Colony, a Bellagio Center Fellowship through the Rockefeller Foundation, and residencies at the Blue Mountain Center and Djerassi Artists Residency Program. He received the Courage of Conscience Award from the Peace Abbey for his efforts to reduce inner-city violence by establishing the gun-buyback program in Boston.

MacDonald lives in Brooklyn, New York, and writes and speaks on topics from "Race and Class in America" to "Trauma, Healing, and Social Change." MacDonald is a writer in residence at Northeastern University in Boston.

MacDonald has been involved in social justice initiatives and educational programs. He collaborates with community organizations to address issues related to systemic violence and socioeconomic disparities. His work includes "The Rest of the Story," a trauma-informed writing curriculum that has been implemented in settings including prisons, poverty alleviation programs, and survivor groups. It aims to transform personal trauma into agency and advocacy.

MacDonald has been a guest lecturer at academic institutions, focusing on narrative storytelling as a tool for advocacy and social change. He holds a Fulbright Scholarship at Queen’s University in Belfast, where he introduced storytelling methodologies to empower grassroots organizations.

== Books ==
=== All Souls: A Family Story from Southie ===
External videos
- Booknotes interview with MacDonald on All Souls, December 12, 1999, C-SPAN
- Presentation by MacDonald on All Souls, January 30, 2000, C-SPAN

All Souls: A Family Story from Southie (Beacon Press, September 1999), won an American Book Award and New England Literary Lights Award, as well as the Myers Outstanding Book Award administered by the Myers Center for the Study of Bigotry and Human Rights in North America.

It is a memoir about MacDonald's life growing up in the Old Colony housing projects in South Boston, a predominantly white Irish Catholic neighborhood. He writes about the crime, drugs, and violence in his neighborhood in the years following Boston's busing riots, and of his brothers and sisters, several of whom were affected by drugs, crime, and suicide. The book describes his mother, Helen King, who raised her nine surviving children in the projects. The book often mentions Whitey Bulger, a gangster and FBI informant in Southie, who brought the drug trade into the neighborhood, contributing to the deaths of hundreds of young people leading to suicides, murders, and overdoses.

=== Easter Rising: A Memoir of Roots and Rebellion ===
Released in October 2006, Easter Rising: A Memoir of Roots and Rebellion continues MacDonald's personal story. It tells of his path out of Southie and the history of the 1980s punk subculture, punk ideologies, and post-punk music scenes, and meeting older family members.
