= List of Bonfire band members =

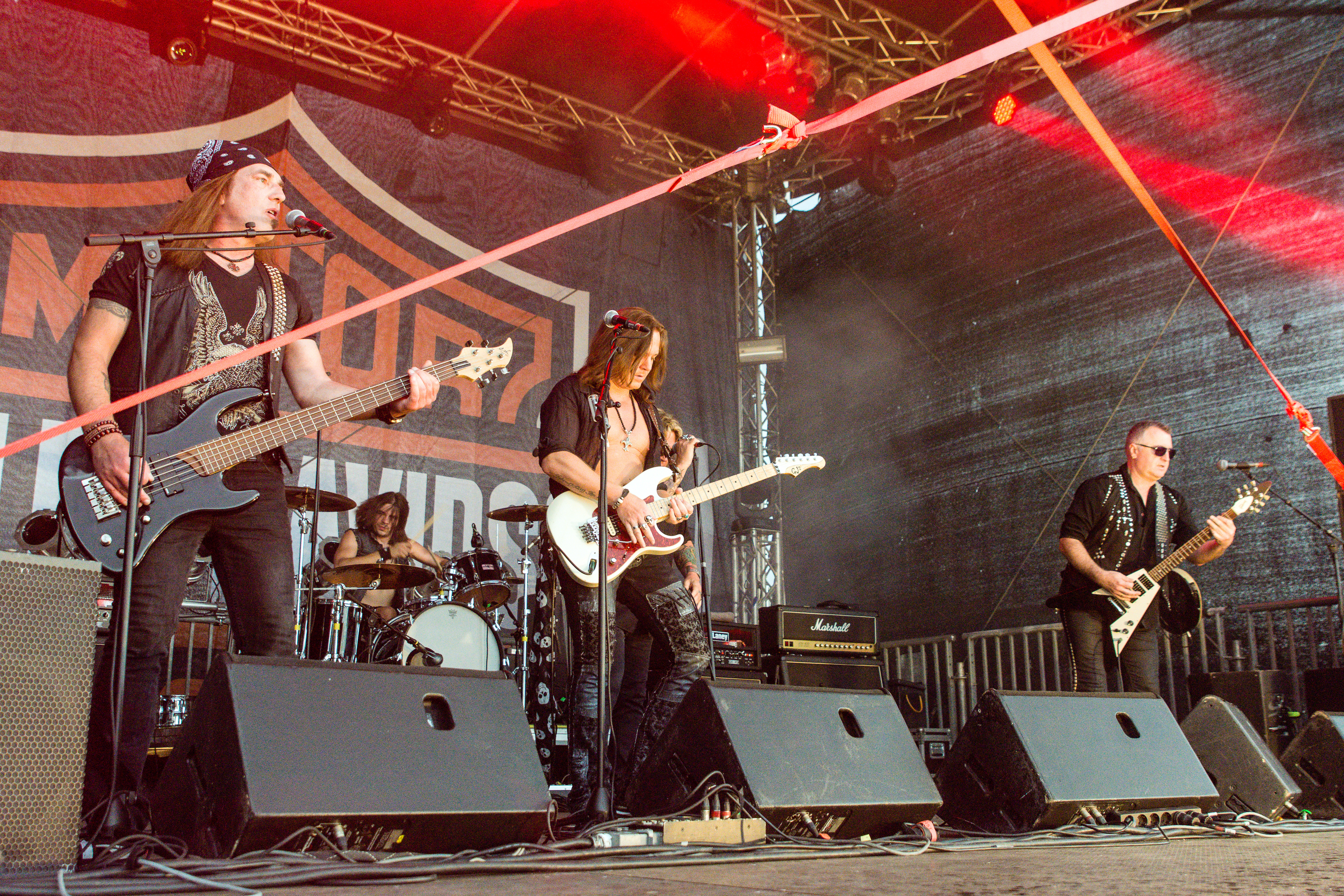
Bonfire performing in 2016

Bonfire is a German heavy metal band from Ingolstadt. Formed in 1972 under the name Cacumen, the group's initial lineup after changing its name to Bonfire in 1986 consisted of lead vocalist Claus Lessmann, guitarists Hans Ziller and Horst Maier-Thorn, bassist Jörg Deisinger, and drummer Dominik Hülshorst. The band's current lineup includes Ziller, plus guitarist Frank Pané, bassist Ronnie Parkes (both of whom joined in 2015), drummer Fabio Alessandrini (since 2022), lead vocalist DYAN (since 2022).

== History ==
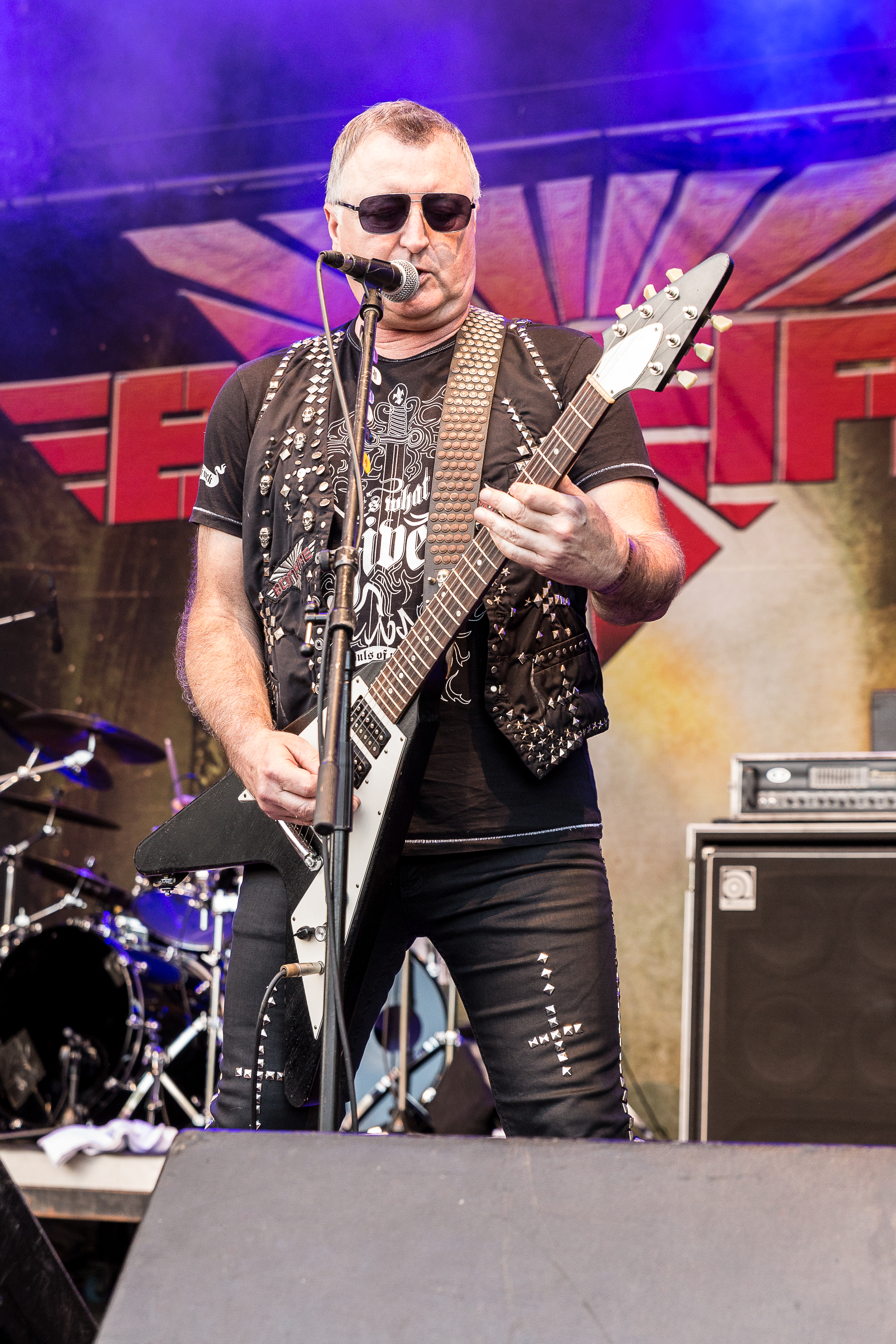
Guitarist Hans Ziller founded Bonfire as Cacumen in 1972.

=== 1972–1994 ===
Bonfire traces its roots back to Cacumen, a band formed by Hans Ziller in 1972 which released a single, two albums and an EP with various lineups. The band changed its name to Bonfire and released Don't Touch the Light, their debut album with the new moniker, in 1986. During the recording of its follow-up Fireworks the next year, Hülshorst left the band and Ken Mary stepped in temporarily as a session performer, before Tommy Wagner joined briefly for a few shows after its release. In December 1987, a full-time replacement for Hülshorst was found in Edgar Patrik, formerly of Sinner and Samson. During the subsequent tour, Maier-Thorn was forced to leave due to rheumatism and was replaced by Gerhard "Angel" Schleifer, also formerly of Sinner. The group recorded its fourth album Point Blank in 1989.

Shortly after recording Point Blank, Ziller left Bonfire in August 1989 due to "personal and musical differences". According to Deisinger, the guitarist was fired following disputes with the band's management over alleged commitment issues. After his dismissal, Ziller reportedly attempted to prevent the release of Point Blank, claiming he had not been "properly credited" on the album. The album was released in October, however, and the band continued as a four-piece. The new lineup released Knock Out in 1991 and recorded the group's first live album Live... the Best, before Lessmann also left in September 1992. Lessmann and Ziller subsequently reunited to release the EP Glaub Dran. In March 1993, Bonfire brought in Michael Bormann as their new frontman, with whom they toured until July 1994.

=== 1996–2015 ===
After a two-year hiatus, Claus Lessmann and Hans Ziller regained the rights to the Bonfire name and reformed the band in 1996 to release Feels Like Comin' Home, an English re-recording of Glaub Dran with additional tracks. The album featured contributions from a wide range of session musicians, as well as former drummer Dominik Hülshorst. Also featured was keyboardist and rhythm guitarist Chris Lausmann, who subsequently became an official member of the band alongside new bassist Uwe Köhler and drummer Jürgen "Bam Bam" Wiehler. The group issued Rebel Soul, Fuel to the Flames, and Strike Ten from 1998 to 2001.

Following the release of Live Over Europe in 2002, Lausmann left Bonfire for "personal reasons". The band continued as a four-piece (with Thomas Streck performing keyboards as a backup member). By early 2006, the group was a five-piece again with the addition of Chris "Yps" Limburg on second guitar, who had previously performed as a guest on 2005's One Acoustic Night. The new lineup released two studio albums – Double X and The Räuber – as well as the live album Double X Vision. In January 2009, Wiehler was replaced by the band's original drummer Dominik Hülshorst. He remained in the band's lineup for three years, releasing Branded, Fireworks Still Alive and Cry for Help, before being replaced by Harry Reischmann in April 2012.

=== Since 2015 ===
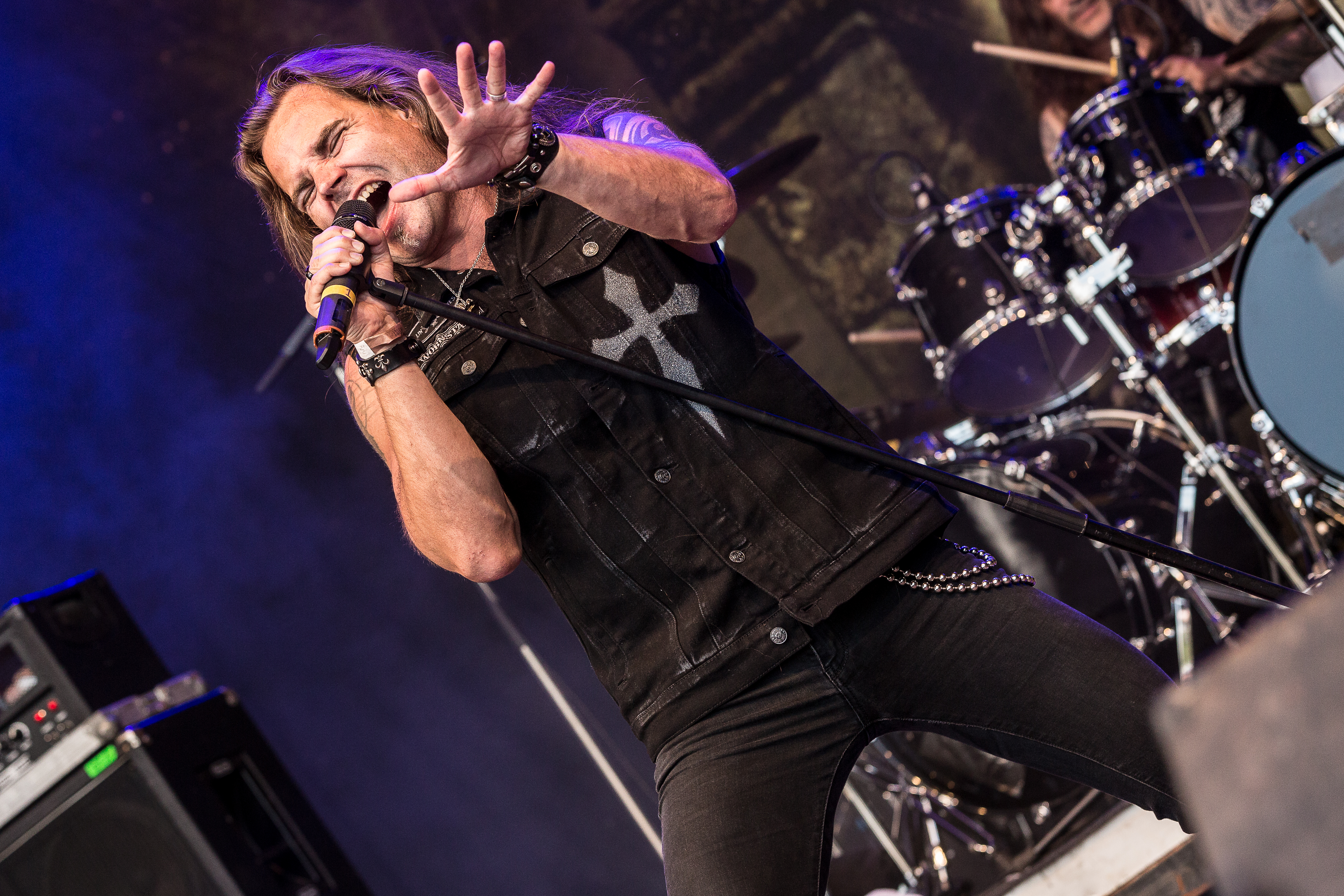
Alexx Stahl has been Bonfire's frontman since August 2016.

After not releasing a new album since 2011, Bonfire announced at the beginning of 2015 that Lessmann, Limburg and Köhler had all left the band, replaced by David Reece (formerly of Accept), Frank Pané and Ronnie Parkes, respectively. The new lineup issued Glörious in April, before Reischmann was replaced by Tim Briedeband in December. Pearls followed in March 2016, before Reece left that July due to "irreconcilable personal and professional differences". The band's former vocalist Michael Bormann was originally slated to join as Reece's replacement, however he was unable to join until mid-October which led the group to bring in Alexx Stahl as a temporary stand-in for a short run of shows. Due to his performances, he was upgraded to an official member, instead of Bormann.

Between 2017 and 2018, Bonfire released three studio albums with Stahl: Byte the Bullet, Temple of Lies and Legends. In February 2019, drummer Briedeband was replaced by André Hilgers, another former member of Sinner. Fistful of Fire and Roots followed in 2020 and 2021, respectively.

== Members ==
=== Current ===
Image	Name	Years active	Instruments	Release contributions
	Hans Ziller	1972–1989 (Note: Hans Ziller, Claus Lessmann and Horst Maier-Thorn were all members of Cacumen prior to the band's name change to Bonfire in 1986.); 1996–present	lead and rhythm guitars; talkbox; backing vocals	all Bonfire releases, except "Sword and Stone" (1989), Knock Out (1991) and Live... the Best (1993)
	Frank Pané	2015–present	rhythm and lead guitars; backing vocals	all Bonfire releases from Glörious (2015) onwards
	Ronnie Parkes	2015–present	bass; backing vocals	all Bonfire releases from Glörious (2015) onwards
	Fabio Alessandrini	2022–present	drums; percussion	all Bonfire releases from Freedom Is My Belief (MMXXIII Version) (2022) onwards
	DYAN	2022–present	lead vocals	all Bonfire releases from Fantasy (MMXXIII Version) (2022) onwards

=== Former ===
Image	Name	Years active	Instruments	Release contributions
	Claus Lessmann	1978–1992; 1996–2015	lead vocals; acoustic and rhythm guitars; bass	all Bonfire releases from Don't Touch the Light (1986) to Live in Wacken (2013)
	Jörg Deisinger	1986–1994	bass; backing vocals	all Bonfire releases from Don't Touch the Light (1986) to Live... the Best (1993)
	Horst Maier-Thorn	1972–1988 (died 2017)	rhythm and lead guitars; backing vocals	Don't Touch the Light (1986); Fireworks (1987)
	Dominik Hülshorst	1986–1987; 1996 (session); 2009–2012	drums; percussion; backing vocals	Don't Touch the Light (1986); Feels Like Comin' Home (1996) – features on select tracks only as guest performer; "Deutsche Nationalhymne" (2010); Branded (2011); Fireworks Still Alive (2011); Cry for Help (2012)
	Ken Mary	1987 (session)	drums	Firework (1987)
	Tommy Wagner	1987 (touring)	drums	none
	Edgar Patrik	1987–1994	drums; percussion; backing vocals	Point Blank (1989); "Sword and Stone" (1989); Knock Out (1991); Live... the Best (1993)
	Gerhard "Angel" Schleifer	1988–1994	lead and rhythm guitars; backing vocals	Point Blank (1989); "Sword and Stone" (1989); Knock Out (1991); Live... the Best (1993)
	Michael Bormann	1993–1994; 2016	lead vocals; acoustic guitar	none
	Uwe Köhler	1996–2015	bass; backing vocals	all Bonfire releases from Rebel Soul (1997) to Live in Wacken (2013)
	Jürgen "Bam Bam" Wiehler	1996–2009	drums; percussion; backing vocals	all Bonfire releases from Rebel Soul (1997) to The Räuber (2008); Live in Wacken (2013)
	Chris Lausmann	1996–2002	rhythm and lead guitar; keyboards; backing vocals	all Bonfire releases from Feels Like Comin' Home (1996) to Live Over Europe! (2002); Live in Wacken (2013)
	Chris "Yps" Limburg	2006–2015	rhythm and lead guitars; backing vocals	all Bonfire releases from One Acoustic Night (2005) to "Treueband" (2012)
	Harry Reischmann	2012–2015	drums	"Treueband" (2012); Glörious (2015)
	David Reece	2015–2016	lead vocals	Glörious (2015); Pearls (2016)
	Tim Breideband	2015–2019	drums; percussion; backing vocals	all Bonfire releases from Pearls (2016) to Live on Holy Ground: Wacken 2018 (2019)
	Alexx Stahl	2016–2022	lead vocals	all Bonfire releases from Byte the Bullet (2017) to Freedom Is My Belief (MMXXIII Version) (2022)
	André Hilgers	2019–2022	drums; percussion	all Bonfire releases from Live on Holy Ground: Wacken 2018 (2019) to Roots (2021)

== Lineups ==
Period	Members	Releases
Band known as Cacumen prior to May 1986
May 1986 – May 1987	Claus Lessmann – lead vocals; Hans Ziller – guitar, backing vocals; Horst Maier-Thorn – guitar, backing vocals; Jörg Deisinger – bass, backing vocals; Dominik Hülshorst – drums, backing vocals	Don't Touch the Light (1986)
Summer 1987	Claus Lessmann – lead vocals; Hans Ziller – guitar, backing vocals; Horst Maier-Thorn – guitar, backing vocals; Jörg Deisinger – bass, backing vocals; Ken Mary – drums (session member)	Fireworks (1987)
Late 1987	Claus Lessmann – lead vocals; Hans Ziller – guitar, backing vocals; Horst Maier-Thorn – guitar, backing vocals; Jörg Deisinger – bass, backing vocals; Tommy Wagner – drums (touring member)	none
December 1987 – July 1988	Claus Lessmann – lead vocals; Hans Ziller – guitar, backing vocals; Horst Maier-Thorn – guitar, backing vocals; Jörg Deisinger – bass, backing vocals; Edgar Patrik – drums, backing vocals	none
August 1988 – August 1989	Claus Lessmann – lead vocals, guitar; Hans Ziller – guitar, backing vocals; Angel Schleifer – guitar, backing vocals; Jörg Deisinger – bass, backing vocals; Edgar Patrik – drums, backing vocals	Point Blank (1989)
August 1989 – September 1992	Claus Lessmann – lead vocals, guitar; Angel Schleifer – guitar, backing vocals; Jörg Deisinger – bass, backing vocals; Edgar Patrik – drums, backing vocals	"Sword and Stone" (1989); Knock Out (1991); Live... the Best (1993); Live at Wacken (2013)
March 1993 – July 1994	Michael Bormann – lead vocals, guitar; Angel Schleifer – guitar, backing vocals; Jörg Deisinger – bass, backing vocals; Edgar Patrik – drums, backing vocals	none
Band inactive August 1994 – June 1996
Summer – late 1996	Claus Lessmann – lead vocals, guitar, bass; Hans Ziller – guitar, backing vocals	Feels Like Comin' Home (1996)
Late 1996 – late 2002	Claus Lessmann – lead vocals, guitar; Hans Ziller – guitar, backing vocals; Chris Lausmann – guitar, keys, vocals; Uwe Köhler – bass, backing vocals; Jürgen Wiehler – drums, backing vocals	Rebel Soul (1997); "Because It's Christmas" (1997); Fuel to the Flames (1999); Strike Ten (2001); Live Over Europe (2002)
Late 2002 – early 2006	Claus Lessmann – lead vocals, guitar; Hans Ziller – guitar, backing vocals; Uwe Köhler – bass, backing vocals; Jürgen Wiehler – drums, backing vocals	"Tell Me What U Know" (2003); Free (2003); "Schanzer Herz" (2004); One Acoustic Night (2005)
Early 2006 – January 2009	Claus Lessmann – lead vocals, guitar; Hans Ziller – guitar, backing vocals; Chris Limburg – guitar, backing vocals; Uwe Köhler – bass, backing vocals; Jürgen Wiehler – drums, backing vocals	Double X (2006); Double X Vision (2007); The Räuber (2008)
January 2009 – April 2012	Claus Lessmann – lead vocals, rhythm guitar; Hans Ziller – guitar, backing vocals; Chris Limburg – guitar, backing vocals; Uwe Köhler – bass, backing vocals; Dominik Hülshorst – drums, backing vocals	"Deutsche Nationalhymne" (2010); Branded (2011); Fireworks Still Alive (2011); Cry for Help (2012)
April 2012 – January 2015	Claus Lessmann – lead vocals, rhythm guitar; Hans Ziller – guitar, backing vocals; Chris Limburg – guitar, backing vocals; Uwe Köhler – bass, backing vocals; Harry Reischmann – drums	"Treueband" (2012)
January – December 2015	David Reece – lead vocals; Hans Ziller – guitar, backing vocals; Frank Pané – guitar, backing vocals; Ronnie Parkes – bass, backing vocals; Harry Reischmann – drums	Glörious (2015)
December 2015 – July 2016	David Reece – lead vocals; Hans Ziller – guitar, backing vocals; Frank Pané – guitar, backing vocals; Ronnie Parkes – bass, backing vocals; Tim Breideband – drums, backing vocals	Pearls (2016)
July – August 2016	Michael Bormann – lead vocals; Hans Ziller – guitar, backing vocals; Frank Pané – guitar, backing vocals; Ronnie Parkes – bass, backing vocals; Tim Breideband – drums, backing vocals	none
August 2016 – February 2019	Alexx Stahl – lead vocals; Hans Ziller – guitar, backing vocals; Frank Pané – guitar, backing vocals; Ronnie Parkes – bass, backing vocals; Tim Breideband – drums, backing vocals	Byte the Bullet (2017); Temple of Lies (2018); Legends (2018); Live on Holy Ground: Wacken 2018 (2019)
February 2019 – May 2022	Alexx Stahl – lead vocals; Hans Ziller – guitar, backing vocals; Frank Pané – guitar, backing vocals; Ronnie Parkes – bass, backing vocals; André Hilgers – drums, percussion	Fistful of Fire (2020); Roots (2021)
May 2022 - October 2022	Alexx Stahl – lead vocals; Hans Ziller – guitar, backing vocals; Frank Pané – guitar, backing vocals; Ronnie Parkes – bass, backing vocals; Fabio Alessandrini – drums, percussion	Freedom Is My Belief (MMXXIII Version) (2022)
October 2022 - December 2022	Hans Ziller – guitar, backing vocals; Frank Pané – guitar, backing vocals; Ronnie Parkes – bass, backing vocals; Fabio Alessandrini – drums, percussion	none
December 2022 - present	DYAN - lead vocals; Hans Ziller – guitar, backing vocals; Frank Pané – guitar, backing vocals; Ronnie Parkes – bass, backing vocals; Fabio Alessandrini – drums, percussion	Fantasy (MMXXIII Version) (2022); Don’t Touch The Light (MMXXIII Version) (2023); Fireworks (MMXXIII Version) (2023); Point Plank (MMXXIII Version) (2023)
