= Branded (Bonfire album) =

Studio album by Bonfire
- Released: 14 January 2011
- Recorded: 2010
- Genre: Hard rock
- Length: 59:37
- Label: LZ Records; Sony Music
- Producer: Lessmann/Ziller

Bonfire chronology
You Make Me Feel (2009)	Branded (2011)	Fireworks Still Alive (2011)

Branded is the twelfth album by the German hard rock band Bonfire. It was released in 2011 by LZ Records and Sony Music. This is the first full album to be released with Bonfire's original drummer, Dominik Huelshorst, back behind the drum kit for the band. Two extra tracks were included, acoustic versions of "I Need You" (from the Strike Ten album) and "Rivers Of Glory" (from the Knock Out album) that were recorded in 2011 with Claus Lessmann and Hans Ziller playing acoustic guitars and Chiara Ziller (Hans' daughter) on piano.

== Track listing ==
No.	Title	Writer(s)	Length
1.	"Deadly Contradiction"	Claus Lessmann, Hans Ziller	5:47
2.	"Just Follow The Rainbow"	Lessmann, Ziller	3:50
3.	"Save Me"	Lessmann, Ziller	5:19
4.	"Let It Grow"	Lessmann, Ziller	5:13
5.	"Better Days"	Lessmann, Ziller	7:10
6.	"Do Or Die"	Lessmann, Ziller	6:01
7.	"Close To The Edge"	Lessmann, Ziller	4:51
8.	"Crazy"	Lessmann, Ziller	4:25
9.	"Loser's Lane"	Lessmann, Ziller	3:19
10.	"Hold Me Now"	Lessmann, Ziller	5:43
11.	"I Need You (Private Version 2011)"	Lessmann, Ziller	3:39
12.	"Rivers Of Glory (Private Version 2011)"	Angel Schleifer, Lessmann	4:20

== Band members ==
- Claus Lessmann - lead vocals, rhythm guitar
- Hans Ziller - lead, rhythm & acoustic guitars
- Chris Limburg - guitars
- Uwe Köhler - bass
- Dominik Huelshorst - drums, percussion

== Charts ==
Chart (2011)	Peak position
German Albums (Offizielle Top 100)	91
