= Longing for You (EP) =

EP by Cacumen
- Released: 1985
- Genre: Hard rock
- Length: 17:33
- Label: Boom Records
- Producer: Ernest Krichel

Cacumen chronology
Bad Widow (1983)	Longing for You (1985)	Don't Touch the Light (1986)

Longing for You is an EP by German hard rock band Cacumen, released in 1985 on the independent label Boom Records. It was because of this recording that the band would finally be signed to a major recording label in 1986 and rename themselves Bonfire. In 2002/2003, Claus Lessmann and Hans Ziller purchased the rights to the Cacumen material and re-released the collection under the Bonfire name individually as well as a box set called The Early Days. This recording was part 3 of the collection, renamed to 'Down to Hell' and featured six previously unreleased recordings.

== Track listing ==
No.	Title	Writer(s)	Length
1.	"Longing for You"	Claus Lessmann, Hans Ziller	4:05
2.	"Woman"	Lessmann, Ziller	3:56
3.	"Down to Hell"	Horst Maier-Thorn, Lessmann	3:42
4.	"The Day Before"	Lessmann, Ziller	5:50

== Band members ==
- Claus Lessmann - lead vocals
- Hans Ziller - lead and rhythm guitar, talkbox
- Horst Maier - lead and rhythm guitar
- Robert Prskalowicz - bass
- Hans Forstner - drums
