= Schanzer Herz =

Single by Bonfire
- Released: 27 August 2004
- Genre: Hard rock
- Length: 23:11
- Label: LZ Records
- Songwriter(s): Claus Lessmann/Hans Ziller

Bonfire singles chronology
"Tell Me What U Know" (2003)	"Schanzer Herz" (2004)	"Deutsche Nationalhymne" (2010)

"Schanzer Herz" is a single released by the German hard rock band Bonfire that had not appeared on a previously released album. It was released in 2004 by LZ Records. The single was only available in Germany and was dedicated to the football team FC Ingolstadt 04, becoming the team's theme song. Two previously unreleased versions of "I Need You" and "Southern Winds" from the album Strike Ten are also featured. The female backing vocalist on "I Need You" is not credited.

== Track listing ==
No.	Title	Writer(s)	Length
1.	"Schanzer Herz"	Claus Lessmann, Hans Ziller	4:26
2.	"Schanzer Herz (Radio Mix)"	Lessmann, Ziller	3:27
3.	"Schanzer Herz (Karaoke Mix)"	Lessmann, Ziller	4:25
4.	"Schanzer Marsch"	Lessmann, Ziller	2:11
5.	"I Need You (Remix)"	Lessmann, Ziller	3:49
6.	"Southern Winds (Acoustic Mix)"	Lessmann, Ziller	4:53

== Band members ==
- Claus Lessmann - lead vocals, rhythm guitar
- Hans Ziller - lead, rhythm and acoustic guitars
- Uwe Köhler - bass
- Jürgen Wiehler - drums, percussion
