= Double vision (disambiguation) =

Double vision refers to diplopia, the perception of two images from a single object.

Double vision may also refer to:

== Film and television ==
- Double Vision (1971 film), a short film by Peter Campus
- Double Vision (1992 film), a television film directed by Robert Knights
- Double Vision (2002 film), a film directed by Chen Kuo-fu
- Double Vision (company), a Malaysian TV production company
- "Double Vision" (Johnny Bravo), a 2004 episode of Johnny Bravo
- Double Vision, a 1993–96 Cartoon Network programming block

== Literature ==
- Double Vision (novel), a 2003 novel by Pat Barker
- Double Vision, a 2004 novel by George Garrett
- Double Vision, a 2005 novel by Tricia Sullivan

== Music ==
- Double Vision (band), Spanish eurodance duo group
- Double Vision (Bob James and David Sanborn album), 1986
- Double Vision (Bonfire album), 2007
  - Double Vision (video), 2007
- Double Vision (Foreigner album), 1978
  - "Double Vision" (Foreigner song), the title song
- "Double Vision" (3OH!3 song), 2010
- Double Vision (Prince Royce album), 2015

== See also ==
- Seeing Double (disambiguation)
