= Bad Widow =

Studio album by Cacumen
- Released: 1983
- Genre: Hard rock
- Length: 43:49
- Label: Boom Records
- Producer: Hanns Schmidt-Theißen

Cacumen chronology
Cacumen (1981)	Bad Widow (1983)	Longing for You (EP) (1985)

Bad Widow is the second and last full-length album by the German hard rock band Cacumen. It was released in 1983 on the independent label Boom Records. Cacumen would rename themselves Bonfire in 1986. In 2002/2003, Claus Lessmann and Hans Ziller purchased the rights to the Cacumen material and re-released the collection under the Bonfire name individually as well as a box set called The Early Days.

== Track listing ==
No.	Title	Writer(s)	Length
1.	"Ain't Got No Woman"	Claus Lessmann, Hans Ziller	3:22
2.	"Bad Widow"	Horst Maier-Thorn, Lessmann	5:37
3.	"Games of Loneliness"	Lessmann, Ziller	5:20
4.	"Broken Man"	Maier-Thorn	5:22
5.	"Too Old to Rock"	Lessmann, Ziller	3:44
6.	"You Are My Destiny"	Lessmann, Ziller	4:19
7.	"Tonight"	Maier-Thorn, Lessmann	4:47
8.	"Strong Desire"	Lessmann, Ziller	3:34
9.	"I'm Gonna Make It Someday"	Lessmann, Ziller	4:00
10.	"Rescue Me"	Maier-Thorn, Lessmann	3:44

== Band members ==
- Claus Lessmann - lead vocals
- Hans Ziller - lead & rhythm guitar, talkbox
- Horst Maier - lead & rhythm guitar
- Robert Prskalowicz - bass
- Hans Forstner - drums

== Covers ==
In 1990, the German band Number Nine did a cover version of "You Are My Destiny" for their Everybody's Crazy album. The title was plainly called "Destiny".
