= Deutsche Nationalhymne =

Single by Bonfire
- Released: 20 May 2010
- Genre: Hard rock
- Length: 16:53
- Label: LZ Records/Universal
- Songwriter(s): August Heinrich Hoffmann von Fallersleben
- Producer(s): Claus Lessmann/Hans Ziller

Bonfire singles chronology
"Schanzer Herz" (2004)	"Deutsche Nationalhymne" (2010)	"Cry for Help EP" (2012)

"Deutsche Nationalhymne" is a single by the German heavy metal band Bonfire that had not appeared on a previously released album. It was released in 2010 by the imprint LZ Records and the first release by the band under their new contract with Universal Music. The single was only available in Germany and was recorded in support for the 2010 World Cup event in South Africa for the German football team. It was a recording of the German National Anthem in a hard rock arrangement. The song managed to enter the Top 50 Songs listing in Germany and it was the first time that a National Anthem had ever entered the Top 50 of any music chart.

== Track listing ==
No.	Title	Length
1.	"Deutsche Nationalhymne - Rock Version"	4:28
2.	"Deutsche Nationalhymne - Rock Ballad Version"	3:55
3.	"Deutsche Nationalhymne - Instrumental Version"	3:53
4.	"Deutsche Nationalhymne - Deutschland singt für Deutschland Fanchor Version"	4:37

== Band members ==
- Claus Lessmann – lead vocals, rhythm guitar
- Hans Ziller – guitar
- Chris Limburg – guitar
- Uwe Köhler – bass
- Dominik Huelshorst – drums, percussion
