= Cacumen (album) =

Studio album by Cacumen
- Released: 1981
- Genre: Hard rock
- Length: 35:56
- Label: Rockport Records
- Producer: Hanns Schmidt-Theißen

Cacumen chronology
Cacumen (1981)	Bad Widow (1983)

Cacumen is the first full-length album by the heavy metal band Cacumen. It was released in 1981 on the independent label Rockport Records. The album came out after their single, Riding Away, was released two years prior and features a new version of that song. Cacumen would rename themselves Bonfire in 1986. In 2002/2003, Claus Lessmann and Hans Ziller purchased the rights to the Cacumen material and re-release the collection under the Bonfire name individually as well as a box set called The Early Days.

== Track listing ==
No.	Title	Writer(s)	Length
1.	"Berlin Girls"	Claus Lessmann, Hans Ziller	3:49
2.	"Queen of the Town"	Lessmann, Ziller	3:18
3.	"No Reason to Fight"	Lessmann, Ziller	4:50
4.	"Long Way"	Lessmann, Ziller	3:34
5.	"You Are Near"	Horst Maier, Lessmann	3:12
6.	"Magic Spell"	Lessmann, Ziller	4:55
7.	"Lovesong"	Lessmann, Ziller	3:04
8.	"Riding Away"	Lessmann, Ziller	4:50
9.	"On the Rocks"	Lessmann, Ziller	4:24

== Band members ==
- Claus Lessmann – lead vocals
- Hans Ziller – lead & rhythm guitar
- Horst Maier – lead & rhythm guitar
- Hans Hauptmann – bass
- Hans Forstner – drums
