= Don't Touch the Light =

Studio album by Bonfire
- Released: 1986
- Recorded: 1985
- Genre: Heavy metal, glam metal
- Length: 37:56
- Label: RCA Records
- Producer: Dave Hutchins and Bonfire

Bonfire chronology
Longing for You (EP) (1985)	Don't Touch the Light (1986)	Fireworks (1987)

Professional ratings
Review scores
Source	Rating
AllMusic	2/5 stars
The Encyclopedia of Popular Music	2/5 stars

Don't Touch the Light is the first album by German hard rock band Bonfire, following its name change from Cacumen. It was released in 1986 on RCA Records.

AllMusic wrote that the album is considered a "classic" of the "melodic hard rock" genre.

== Track listing ==
No.	Title	Writer(s)	Length
1.	"Intro"	Claus Lessmann, Hans Ziller, Horst Maier-Thorn, Joerg Deisinger, Dominik Huelshorst	1:58
2.	"Starin' Eyes"	Maier-Thorn, Lessmann	4:10
3.	"Hot to Rock"	Ziller, Deisinger, Lessmann	4:12
4.	"You Make Me Feel"	Ziller, Lessmann	4:44
5.	"Longing for You"	Lessmann, Ziller, Maier-Thorn	3:45
6.	"Don't Touch the Light"	Ziller, Maier-Thorn, Lessmann	4:31
7.	"S.D.I."	Lessmann, Ziller, Maier-Thorn	5:47
8.	"No More"	Ziller, Lessmann	4:10
9.	"L.A."	Ziller, Lessmann	4:39

== Remastered edition ==
In 2009, Don't Touch the Light was remastered by Toni Ubler for the company Yesterrock. This edition of the album now featured seven additional songs—all live performances by Bonfire from circa 1986 when the album was originally released.

No.	Title	Writer(s)	Length
1.	"Intro"	Claus Lessmann, Hans Ziller, Horst Maier-Thorn, Joerg Deisinger, Dominik Huelshorst	1:56
2.	"Starin' Eyes"	Maier-Thorn, Lessmann	4:10
3.	"Hot to Rock"	Ziller, Deisinger, Lessmann	4:12
4.	"You Make Me Feel"	Ziller, Lessmann	4:44
5.	"Longing for You"	Lessmann, Ziller, Maier-Thorn	3:45
6.	"Don't Touch the Light"	Ziller, Maier-Thorn, Lessmann	4:31
7.	"S.D.I."	Lessmann, Ziller, Maier-Thorn	5:47
8.	"No More"	Ziller, Lessmann	4:10
9.	"L.A."	Ziller, Lessmann	4:56
10.	"Intro/Starin' Eyes (live)"	Lessmann, Ziller, Maier-Thorn, Deisinger, Huelshorst	5:17
11.	"Don't Touch the Light (live)"	Ziller, Maier-Thorn, Lessmann	5:02
12.	"S.D.I. (live)"	Lessmann, Ziller, Maier-Thorn	6:05
13.	"You Make Me Feel (live)"	Ziller, Lessmann	3:08
14.	"Longing for You (live)"	Lessmann, Ziller, Maier-Thorn	3:38
15.	"You Are My Destiny (live)"	Lessmann, Ziller	4:11
16.	"Bad Widow (live)"	Maier-Thorn, Lessmann	8:08

== Band members ==
- Claus Lessmann - lead & backing vocals
- Hans Ziller - lead & acoustic guitars, backing vocals
- Horst Maier - lead guitar, backing vocals
- Joerg Deisinger - bass, backing vocals
- Dominik Huelshorst - drums, percussion, backing vocals
