= Fireworks (Bonfire album) =

Studio album by Bonfire
- Released: 18 October 1987
- Recorded: 1987
- Genre: Glam metal
- Length: 42:50
- Label: BMG International
- Producer: Michael Wagener

Bonfire chronology
Don't Touch the Light (1986)	Fireworks (1987)	Point Blank (1989)

Alternative cover
- North American album cover

Professional ratings
Review scores
Source	Rating
Kerrang!	4/5 stars

Fireworks is the second album by the German hard rock band Bonfire. It was released in 1987 on the label BMG International with two different covers, the worldwide one had a patterned similar to a decorated vault door while the North American version was simply four pictures of each band member in each corner of the cover. This album was recorded with a guest drummer, Ken Mary from Fifth Angel, because the band's drummer was fired during the writing sessions. A new drummer was hired just before the band toured in support of Fireworks. In 2003, the album was certified a Gold seller. Originally the band had recorded 25 songs, settling on 11 tracks.

== Track listing ==
No.	Title	Writer(s)	Length
1.	"Ready 4 Reaction"	Claus Lessmann, Hans Ziller, Horst Maier-Thorn, Jörg Deisinger	3:43
2.	"Never Mind"	Lessmann, Ziller, Maier-Thorn, Deisinger	3:39
3.	"Sleeping All Alone"	Jack Ponti, Lessmann, Ziller, Maier-Thorn	3:35
4.	"Champion"	Lessmann, Ziller, Maier-Thorn, Deisinger	3:31
5.	"Don't Get Me Wrong"	Lessmann, Ziller, Maier-Thorn, Deisinger	3:25
6.	"Sweet Obsession"	Ponti, Joe Lynn Turner, Lessmann, Ziller, Maier-Thorn, Deisinger	3:02
7.	"Rock Me Now"	Lessmann, Ziller, Maier-Thorn, Deisinger	4:15
8.	"American Nights"	Lessmann, Ziller, Maier-Thorn, Marc Ribler	3:42
9.	"Fantasy"	Lessmann, Ziller, Maier-Thorn, Deisinger	4:41
10.	"Give It a Try"	Lessmann, Ziller, Maier-Thorn, Deisinger	4:32
11.	"Cold Days"	Lessmann, Ziller, Maier-Thorn, Deisinger	4:24

== Band members ==
- Claus Lessmann - lead & backing vocals
- Hans Ziller - lead, rhythm & acoustic guitars, backing vocals
- Horst Maier - rhythm guitar, backing vocals
- Jörg Deisinger - bass, backing vocals

== Additional personnel ==
- Ken Mary - drums, percussion
- Martin Ernst - keyboards

== Remastered Edition ==
In 2009 Fireworks was remastered by Toni Ubler for the company Yesterrock. This edition of the album now featured 8 additional songs, all live performances by Bonfire from circa 1988 with Claus, Hans, Jörg playing in addition to new members Angel Schleifer and Edgar Patrik. The track listing is as follows:

No.	Title	Writer(s)	Length
1.	"Ready 4 Reaction"	Claus Lessmann, Hans Ziller, Hans Maier-Thorn, Jörg Deisinger	3:42
2.	"Never Mind"	Lessmann, Ziller, Maier-Thorn, Deisinger	3:39
3.	"Sleeping All Alone"	Jack Ponti, Joe Lynn Turner, Lessmann, Ziller, Maier-Thorn, Deisinger	3:35
4.	"Champion"	Lessmann, Ziller, Maier-Thorn, Deisinger	3:31
5.	"Don't Get Me Wrong"	Lessmann, Ziller, Maier-Thorn, Deisinger	3:25
6.	"Sweet Obsession"	Ponti, Turner, Lessmann, Ziller, Maier-Thorn, Deisinger	3:02
7.	"Rock Me Now"	Lessmann, Ziller, Maier-Thorn, Deisinger	4:16
8.	"American Nights"	Lessmann, Ziller, Maier-Thorn, Marc Ribler	3:42
9.	"Fantasy"	Lessmann, Ziller, Maier-Thorn, Deisinger	4:40
10.	"Give It a Try"	Lessmann, Ziller, Maier-Thorn, Deisinger	4:32
11.	"Cold Days"	Lessmann, Ziller, Maier-Thorn, Deisinger	4:26
12.	"You Make Me Feel (live)"	Ziller, Lessmann	2:41
13.	"Give It a Try (live)"	Lessmann, Ziller, Maier-Thorn, Deisinger	4:35
14.	"S.D.I. (live)"	Lessmann, Ziller, Maier-Thorn	6:35
15.	"Bass solo (live)"	Deisinger	1:38
16.	"Drum solo (live)"	Edgar Patrik	1:32
17.	"Don't Get Me Wrong (live)"	Lessmann, Ziller, Maier-Thorn, Deisinger	7:17
18.	"Champion (live)"	Lessmann, Ziller, Maier-Thorn, Deisinger	5:17
19.	"American Nights (live)"	Lessmann, Ziller, Maier-Thorn, Ribler	5:51

== Charts ==
Chart (1987)	Peak position
German Albums (Offizielle Top 100)	43
