= Fuel to the Flames =

Album by Bonfire

Studio album by Bonfire
- Released: 30 August 1999
- Recorded: 1999
- Genre: Hard rock
- Length: 60:06
- Label: BMG International
- Producer: Lessmann/Ziller

Bonfire chronology
Rebel Soul (1998)	Fuel to the Flames (1999)	Who's Foolin' Who (2000)

Fuel to the Flames is the seventh album by the German hard rock band Bonfire. Released in 1999 by BMG International, it marks the return of the signature rock sound that the band had been known for.

== Track listing ==
No.	Title	Writer(s)	Length
1.	"Daytona Nights"	Claus Lessmann, Hans Ziller, Uwe Köhler, Chris Lausmann, Jürgen Wiehler	3:51
2.	"Don't Go Changing Me"	Lessmann, Ziller	3:43
3.	"Proud of My Country"	Lessmann, Ziller	4:58
4.	"Sweet Home Alabama"	Ed King, Ronnie Van Zant, Gary Rossington	4:10
5.	"Rebel Pride"	Lessmann, Ziller	5:09
6.	"Goodnight Amanda"	Lessmann, Ziller	5:23
7.	"Ode an die Freude"	Ludwig van Beethoven, Lessmann, Ziller	1:01
8.	"Thumbs Up for Europe"	Lessmann, Ziller	3:47
9.	"Bandit of Love"	Lessmann, Ziller	4:44
10.	"Break Down the Walls"	Lessmann, Ziller	5:19
11.	"Heat in the Glow"	Lessmann, Ziller	3:37
12.	"Life After Love"	Lessmann, Ziller	5:48
13.	"If It Wasn't for You"	Lessmann, Ziller	5:05
14.	"Can't Stop Rockin'"	Lessmann, Ziller	3:31

=== Bonus tracks ===
- Proud of My Country (Acoustic) (4:52)
- Goodnight Amanda (Extended) (6:30)

== Band members ==
- Claus Lessmann - lead & backing vocals, acoustic guitar
- Hans Ziller - lead, rhythm & acoustic guitars, backing vocals, talk box
- Chris Lausmann - lead & rhythm guitar, keyboards, backing vocals
- Uwe Köhler - bass, backing vocals
- Jürgen Wiehler - drums, backing vocals

== Reception ==
Metal Reviews said, "Fuel to the Flames is an excellent way to begin your journey into one of rocks most overlooked bands. This is a good representation of the band the way they are today while still containing elements of their glorious past."

== Charts ==
Chart (1999)	Peak position
German Albums (Offizielle Top 100)	32
