= List of Bonfire video albums =

German heavy metal band Bonfire has released several video albums throughout their career.

== The Best (1993) ==
The Best

Video by Bonfire
- Released: 1993
- Recorded: 1986–1990
- Genre: Hard rock
- Length: 68:03 minutes
- Label: BMG International

The Best is a compilation video released by Bonfire in 1993 which contained all the band's promotional videos from 1986 to 1993. It also includes footage of the band during recording sessions and tours. This package was released alongside the band's Live... The Best album. By the time it was released, Claus Lessmann had already been replaced with Michael Bormann.

Track listing
1 Intro
2 Starin' Eyes
3 Sweet Obsession
4 L.A. (Bonfire in Hollywood)
5 Bonfire Recording Session - Point Blank
6 American Nights (Bonfire in L.A.)
7 Bonfire Recording Session - Knock Out
8 The Stroke
9 Making of...Hard on Me
10 Hard on Me
11 Sword and Stone
12 Sleeping All Alone
13 Cold Days - Promotional Tour of Japan
14 You Make Me Feel - Point Blank Tour in Europe
15 Champion (live)
16 Who's Foolin' Who - Credits

== Golden Bullets (2001) ==
Golden Bullets

Video by Bonfire
- Released: 2001
- Recorded: 1986–1990, 1998, 2001
- Genre: Hard rock
- Length: approx. 100 minutes
- Label: BMG Ariola

Golden Bullets is a compilation video released by German hard rock band Bonfire in 2001. It contains most of the footage from the band's VHS release The Best but excludes the sections "L.A. (Bonfire in Hollywood)" and "Bonfire Recording Session - Point Blank". Included in this DVD package is a live performance at Wacken 1998, Hans Ziller and Claus Lessmann giving an introduction to the videos from 1986 to 1993, and a new video for the song "Under Blue Skies".

Track listing
1 Intro
2 Starin' Eyes
3 Sweet Obsession
4 American Nights (Bonfire in L.A.)
5 Bonfire Recording Session - Knock Out
6 The Stroke
7 Making of...Hard on Me
8 Hard on Me
9 Sword and Stone
10 Sleeping All Alone
11 Cold Days - Promotional Tour of Japan
12 You Make Me Feel - Point Blank Tour in Europe
13 Champion (live)
14 Who's Foolin' Who - Credits
15 Champion (live)
16 Who's Foolin' Who - Credits
Live from Wacken 1998
1 Wake up
2 Never Mind
3 SDI
4 The Stroke
5 American Nights
6 Ready 4 Reaction
Bonus clip
1 Under Blue Skies

== One Acoustic Night (2005) ==
One Acoustic Night

Video by Bonfire
- Released: 2005
- Recorded: 2004
- Genre: Rock
- Length: approx. 99 minutes
- Label: E-M-S

One Acoustic Night is a live video released by Bonfire in 2005. It was a two disc set, the first featured the band playing an acoustic live set and the second featured extra material.

Track listing
DVD #1
1 Free
2 What About Love?
3 Hot To Rock
4 Don't Touch The Light
5 Who's Foolin' Who
6 Give It a Try
7 S.D.I.
8 Proud Of My Country
9 Under Blue Skies
10 American Nights
11 Friends
12 Give a Little
13 Rock 'N' Roll Cowboy
14 I Need You
15 Hard On Me
16 Ready 4 Reaction
17 You Make Me Feel
18 Sweet Obsession
19 Sweet Home Alabama
DVD #2
1 Bam Bam's Drum Solo
2 Interview
3 Behind The Scenes
4 Live In Greece
5 Rock for Asia - Special
6 Gallery

== Double Vision (2007) ==
Double Vision DVD

Video by Bonfire
- Released: 2007
- Recorded: 28 October 2006
- Genre: Hard rock
- Length: approx. 110 minutes
- Label: LZ Records
- Producer: Bernhard Kellerer

Double Vision is a live video released by German hard rock band Bonfire in 2007. It was recorded live at Firefest III in Nottingham, United Kingdom. Aside from the concert, addition footage of the band's videos from the 1980s, behind-the-scenes stuff, and three songs performed at Rockpalast are included.

Track listing
1 Day 911
2 But We Still Rock
3 Never Mind
4 Under Blue Skies
5 Hot to Rock
6 Don't Touch the Light
7 Tony's Roulette
8 Give It a Try
9 American Nights
10 Hard on Me
11 Sweet Obsession
12 Ready 4 Reaction/Champion
13 Bang Down the Door
Music videos
1 Starin' Eyes
2 Sweet Obsession
3 Sleeping All Alone
4 Hard on Me
5 Sword and Stone
Rock gegen Rechts
1 Intro
2 Under Blue Skies
3 Sweet Home Alabama
4 Proud of My Country
Bonfire at Firefest
1 Behind the Scenes

== The Räuber – Live (2009) ==
The Räuber – Live

Video by Bonfire
- Released: 2009
- Recorded: 2008
- Genre: Rock
- Length: approx. 290 minutes
- Label: LZ Records
- Producer: Lessmann/Ziller

The Räuber – Live is a video released by German heavy metal band Bonfire in 2009. It features two discs, the first having the entire rock opera performance of The Räuber while the second one has a behind-the-scenes look at the opera rehearsals and a new updated music video for You Make Me Feel. The rock opera is performed entirely in German with English only being in the songs as they are performed.

Track listing
DVD #1
1 Bells of Freedom
2 The Good Die Young
3 The Oath
4 Blut Und Todt
5 Do You Still Love Me
6 Lass Die Toten Schlafen
7 Drum solo
8 Hip Hip Hurray (Instrumental)
9 Hip Hip Hurray
10 Bells of Freedom (Instrumental)
11 Love Don't Lie
12 Refugee of Fate
13 Let Me Be Your Water (Acoustic)
14 Father's Return
15 Black Night
16 Let Me Be Your Water
17 Hip Hip Hurray (Encore
DVD #2
Videos
1 Bells of Freedom
2 The Good Die Young
3 Blut Und Todt
4 Do You Still Love Me
5 Hip Hip Hurray
6 Love Don't Lie
7 Refugee of Fate
8 Black Night
9 Let Me Be Your Water
Bonus Material
1 TV Special 1
2 TV Special 2
3 Behind The Scenes
4 You Make Me Feel 2008
