= Feels Like Comin' Home =

Studio album by Bonfire
- Released: 5 September 1996
- Genre: Hard rock
- Length: 65:32
- Label: LZ Records
- Producer: Lessmann/Ziller

Bonfire chronology
Glaub dran (1993)	Feels Like Comin' Home (1996)	Hot & Slow (1997)

Freudenfeuer cover
- German language album cover

Feels Like Comin' Home is the "comeback" album by German heavy metal band Bonfire. It is the band's fifth album, released in 1996 on the independent label LZ Records, and featured the reunion of Bonfire. The album contains mostly English versions of the Glaub dran album by Lessmann/Ziller, and a German version of the album, Freudenfeuer, was released as well. Ex-Bonfire drummer Dominik Hülshorst contributed to the drums on the album.

== Track listing ==
No.	Title	Writer(s)	Length
1.	"Easy Come Easy Go"	Claus Lessmann, Hans Ziller	4:12
2.	"Back to You"	Lessmann, Ziller	4:22
3.	"Feels Like Comin’ Home"	Lessmann, Ziller	4:36
4.	"Mama"	Lessmann, Ziller	4:44
5.	"I’d Love You to Want Me"	Roland Kent Lavoie	4:44
6.	"Say"	Lessmann, Ziller	4:52
7.	"Right Now"	Lessmann, Ziller	4:25
8.	"Highway to Your Dreams"	Lessmann, Ziller	4:40
9.	"You Are All"	Lessmann, Ziller	5:12
10.	"Whenever You Cry (I’ll Be There)"	Lessmann, Ziller	4:32
11.	"Rock ’n’ Roll Cowboy"	Lessmann, Ziller	5:49
12.	"I Don’t Want You"	Lessmann, Ziller	4:46
13.	"Can’t Wait"	Lessmann, Ziller	5:24
14.	"Feels Like Comin’ Home (piano version)"	Lessmann, Ziller	3:14

=== German track listing ===
The songs themselves had the same music as the English album but the lyrics are much different and do not correspond to the English songs.

No.	Title	Writer(s)	Length
1.	"Bis wir uns wiedersehen"	Claus Lessmann, Hans Ziller	4:46
2.	"Für dich"	Lessmann, Ziller	4:52
3.	"1001 Nacht"	Lessmann, Ziller	4:40
4.	"Komm her"	Lessmann, Ziller	4:26
5.	"Geld macht sexy"	Lessmann, Ziller	3:39
6.	"Rock ’n’ Roll Cowboy"	Lessmann, Ziller	5:05
7.	"Wach auf"	Lessmann, Ziller	5:23
8.	"Verdammt was will ich"	Lessmann, Ziller	4:49
9.	"Freundschaft"	Lessmann, Ziller	4:10
10.	"Noch ’n Bier"	Lessmann, Ziller	3:51

== Band members ==
- Claus Lessmann - lead & backing vocals, acoustic guitar, bass
- Hans Ziller - lead, rhythm & acoustic guitars, backing vocals
