= The Räuber =

Studio album by Bonfire
- Released: 16 February 2008
- Genre: Hard rock
- Length: 71:07
- Label: LZ Records
- Producer: Lessmann/Ziller

Bonfire chronology
Double Vision (2007)	The Räuber (2008)	You Make Me Feel (2009)

The Räuber is the eleventh album by the German hard rock band Bonfire. It was released in 2008 by LZ Records. The band collaborated with P.W. Politz to create a rock opera called The Räuber that debuted in Ingolstadt, Germany, in March 2008. The opera itself featured the band performing all the songs and went sold out for several weeks. A DVD was released in August 2008 that contained the opera performance as well as a full-length concert by the band. The album features music in both English and German.

== Track listing ==
No.	Title	Writer(s)	Length
1.	"The Räuber"	Claus Lessmann, Hans Ziller	0:56
2.	"Bells of Freedom"	Lessmann, Ziller	5:15
3.	"Refugee of Fate"	Lessmann, Ziller	4:06
4.	"The Oath"	Lessmann, Ziller	1:12
5.	"Blut und Todt"	Lessmann, Ziller	3:51
6.	"Love Don’t Lie"	Lessmann, Ziller	5:38
7.	"Black Night"	Lessmann, Ziller	4:46
8.	"Hip Hip Hurray"	Lessmann, Ziller, Uwe Köhler	4:58
9.	"Do You Still Love Me"	Lessmann, Ziller	4:00
10.	"Let Me Be Your Water"	Lessmann, Ziller	5:18
11.	"Lass die Toten schlafen"	Friedrich Schiller, Lessmann, Ziller	4:39
12.	"The Good Die Young"	Lessmann, Ziller	4:17
13.	"Time"	Lessmann, Ziller	5:25
14.	"Father’s Return"	Lessmann, Ziller	2:35
15.	"Love Don’t Lie (acoustic mix)"	Lessmann, Ziller	5:16
16.	"Do You Still Love Me (acoustic mix)"	Lessmann, Ziller	3:52
17.	"Hip Hip Hurray (German version)"	Lessmann, Ziller, Köhler	4:58

== Band members ==
- Claus Lessmann - lead vocals, rhythm guitar
- Hans Ziller - lead, rhythm & acoustic guitars
- Chris Limburg - guitars
- Uwe Köhler - bass
- Jürgen Wiehler - drums, percussion
