= Free (Bonfire album) =

Studio album by Bonfire
- Released: 6 October 2003
- Genre: Hard rock
- Length: 56:10
- Label: Sony/BMG
- Producer: Lessmann/Ziller

Bonfire chronology
Live Over Europe! (2002)	Free (2003)	The Early Days of Bonfire (2004)

World-wide cover
- World-wide distributed album cover

Free is the ninth album by German hard rock band Bonfire. It was released in 2003 by Sony/BMG/LZ Records and features music that leans more towards the once popular alternative sound. The album had two covers, one for German outlet and another for worldwide distribution. The German cover had a brown wall background while the other one was white. The band was highly criticized by their loyal fans as well as several critics for the material. Reaction overall from fans was less than favourable. The song "September on My Mind" is about the 9/11 terrorist attack on the World Trade Center in New York City. The reason "Friends" has such a long time frame is due to a large space after the song that was followed by band members Claus Lessmann and Hans Ziller making recordings of the album's songs.

== Track listing ==
No.	Title	Writer(s)	Length
1.	"On and On..."	Claus Lessmann, Hans Ziller	4:06
2.	"I Would Do Anything 4 U"	Lessmann, Ziller, Uwe Kohler, Jurgen Wiehler	4:18
3.	"What About Love?"	Lessmann, Ziller	5:03
4.	"Rock 'N' Roll Star (Born to Rock)"	Lessmann, Ziller	3:58
5.	"Free"	Lessmann, Ziller, Kohler, Wiehler	6:14
6.	"Preachers & Whores"	Lessmann, Ziller	4:45
7.	"Love CCA"	Lessmann, Ziller	4:49
8.	"Give a Little"	Lessmann, Ziller	4:29
9.	"September on My Mind"	Lessmann, Ziller, Kohler, Wiehler	4:40
10.	"Friends"	Lessmann, Ziller	12:48

== Personnel ==
- Claus Lessmann – lead vocals, rhythm guitar
- Hans Ziller – lead, rhythm and acoustic guitars, sitar, talk-box, slide
- Uwe Köhler – bass
- Jürgen Wiehler – drums, percussion

== Reviews ==
Metal Reviews said, "this album really lacks energy. All the songs are slow to mid tempo at best, and it just doesn't sound like the guys were very motivated in the studio. On top of that, the usually charismatic and energetic vocal delivery of Clauss Lessman are very laid back, almost lazy at times."

== Charts ==
Chart (2003)	Peak position
German Albums (Offizielle Top 100)	94
