= Fire and Fame =

2008 book by Joerg Deisinger

Fire And Fame
- Author: Joerg Deisinger, Carl Begai
- Cover artist: Thomas Riess
- Language: English
- Genre: Memoir
- Publisher: Books On Demand GmbH
- Publication date: August 2008
- Publication place: Germany
- Media type: Print
- Pages: 240 pp
- ISBN: 978-3-8370-4594-9

Fire And Fame is a memoir co-written by Joerg Deisinger, former bassist and founding member of the German hard rock band Bonfire, and Carl Begai, a Canadian writer and music journalist.

The memoir showcases Deisinger's career as a professional musician, focusing on his formative years, his career with Bonfire from 1985–1994, concluding with a brief overview of his activities from the time he left the band to 2007. The project was inspired by Deisinger's near death experience on 26 December 2004, when he narrowly missed being killed by the tsunami that ripped through Southeast Asia and decimated parts of Thailand. A last minute change of plans for a scheduled vacation while living in Thailand saved him, resulting in weeks and months of reflection, and the final decision to write his memoirs.

Deisinger outlined his idea for the project to Begai in early 2005, mapping out plans for English and German versions of the as-yet-untitled book. Deisinger made it clear from the beginning that Begai would not be a ghost writer, but play an active role in shaping the story. Over a two-year period the pair got together as schedules allowed, with Deisinger dictating the text to Begai in German, who would then translate, arrange and trim the story in English, adding facts and information when necessary. Thus, the book was a genuine collaboration and not a regurgitation of Deisinger's words.

Fire And Fame is an account of Deisinger's life and career, with no embellishment. It does not attempt to cash in on cliché tales of music industry debauchery, although the occasional sordid tale does surface. Some names have been changed to protect the not-so-innocent, and Deisinger makes a point of portraying former bandmates and rivals alike in a respectful light.

The writing for the project, eventually dubbed Fire And Fame by Begai, wrapped up in late 2007 and was released independently in cooperation with Books On Demand GmbH in August 2008. Graphic artist / photographer Thomas Riess did the final layout of the book.

An early 2009 release is planned for the German version of Fire And Fame.
