= Point Blank (Bonfire album) =

Studio album by Bonfire
- Released: 3 October 1989
- Genre: Glam metal
- Length: 57:49
- Label: BMG International
- Producer: Michael Wagener

Bonfire chronology
| Fireworks (1987) | Point Blank (1989) | Knock Out (1991) |

Point Blank is the third album by the hard rock band Bonfire. It was released in 1989 on the label BMG International. During the recording sessions of this album, Hans Ziller was fired from the band, but the album features 10 songs written by him as well as 3 that feature him playing. Freddy Curci from Alias, Sheriff and Zion also contributed to additional backing vocals for this album. Originally, the band had recorded 30 songs and settled on 17 tracks for the album.

It entered the UK album charts on 21 October 1989, and reached number 74; it was only in the chart for 1 week.. At the end of 1989, the album sold nearly 350,000 copies worldwide, most of them in Europe.

== Track listing ==
| No. | Title | Writer(s) | Length |
|---|---|---|---|
| 1. | "Bang Down the Door" | Bob Halligan, Jr, Angel Schleifer, Claus Lessmann, Hans Ziller | 3:19 |
| 2. | "Waste No Time" | Joerg Deisinger, Schleifer, Lessmann | 3:13 |
| 3. | "Hard on Me" | Jack Ponti, Seth Swirsky, Schleifer, Lessmann, Ziller, Deisinger, Edgar Patrik | 3:07 |
| 4. | "Why Is It Never Enough?" | Ziller, Lessmann | 4:11 |
| 5. | "Tony's Roulette" | Ziller, Lessmann | 4:45 |
| 6. | "Minestrone" | Horst Maier-Thorn, Patrik | 0:57 |
| 7. | "You're Back" | Deisinger, Schleifer, Lessmann | 3:10 |
| 8. | "Look of Love" | Deisinger, Schleifer, Lessmann | 4:41 |
| 9. | "The Price of Loving You" | Desmond Child, Schleifer, Lessmann | 3:04 |
| 10. | "Freedom Is My Belief" | Ziller, Lessmann | 3:42 |
| 11. | "Gimme Some" | Ponti, Kelly Keeling, Lance Bulen, Michael Wagener, Lessmann, Deisinger, Schleifer, Patrik, Ziller | 3:16 |
| 12. | "Say Goodbye" | Ziller, Lessmann | 3:42 |
| 13. | "Never Surrender" | Deisinger, Schleifer, Lessmann | 5:00 |
| 14. | "(20th Century) Youth Patrol" | Ziller, Lessmann | 3:24 |
| 15. | "Jungle Call" | Maier-Thorn | 0:30 |
| 16. | "Know Right Now" | Deisinger, Schleifer, Lessmann | 3:52 |
| 17. | "Who's Foolin' Who" | Marc Ribler, Schleifer, Lessmann, Ziller | 3:56 |

== Remastered Edition ==
In 2009 Point Blank was remastered by Toni Ubler for the company Yesterrock. This edition of the album now featured 7 additional songs, all live performances by Bonfire from circa 1989 when the album was originally released. The track listing is as follows:

| No. | Title | Writer(s) | Length |
|---|---|---|---|
| 1. | "Bang Down the Door" | Bob Halligan, Jr, Angel Schleifer, Claus Lessmann, Hans Ziller | 3:18 |
| 2. | "Waste No Time" | Joerg Deisinger, Schleifer, Lessmann | 3:13 |
| 3. | "Hard on Me" | Jack Ponti, Seth Swirsky, Schleifer, Lessmann, Ziller, Deisinger, Edgar Patrik | 3:06 |
| 4. | "Why Is It Never Enough?" | Ziller, Lessmann | 4:11 |
| 5. | "Tony's Roulette" | Ziller, Lessmann | 4:45 |
| 6. | "Minestrone" | Horst Maier-Thorn, Patrik | 0:58 |
| 7. | "You're Back" | Deisinger, Schleifer, Lessmann | 3:10 |
| 8. | "Look of Love" | Deisinger, Schleifer, Lessmann | 4:41 |
| 9. | "The Price of Loving You" | Desmond Child, Schleifer, Lessmann | 3:04 |
| 10. | "Freedom Is My Belief" | Ziller, Lessmann | 3:43 |
| 11. | "Gimme Some" | Ponti, Kelly Keeling, Lance Bulen, Michael Wagener, Lessmann, Deisinger, Schleifer, Patrik, Ziller | 3:15 |
| 12. | "Say Goodbye" | Ziller, Lessmann | 3:42 |
| 13. | "Never Surrender" | Deisinger, Schleifer, Lessmann | 5:00 |
| 14. | "(20th Century) Youth Patrol" | Ziller, Lessmann | 3:24 |
| 15. | "Jungle Call" | Maier-Thorn | 0:30 |
| 16. | "Know Right Now" | Deisinger, Schleifer, Lessmann | 3:52 |
| 17. | "Who's Foolin' Who" | Marc Ribler, Schleifer, Lessmann, Ziller | 3:54 |
| 18. | "You Make Me Feel (live)" | Ziller, Lessmann | 3:03 |
| 19. | "Who's Foolin' Who (live)" | Ribler, Schleifer, Lessmann, Ziller | 4:12 |
| 20. | "Band Introduction (live)" | Lessmann | 2:02 |
| 21. | "(20th Century) Youth Patrol (live)" | Ziller, Lessmann | 2:08 |
| 22. | "Drum Solo (live)" | Patrik | 2:14 |
| 23. | "Don't Get Me Wrong (live)" | Lessmann, Ziller, Maier-Thorn, Deisinger | 3:37 |
| 24. | "Waste No Time (live)" | Deisinger, Schleifer, Lessmann | 3:16 |

== Personnel ==
=== Band members ===
- Claus Lessmann - lead & backing vocals, acoustic guitar
- Angel Schleifer - guitar, backing vocals
- Joerg Deisinger - bass, backing vocals, mouth drums
- Edgar Patrik - drums, percussion, backing vocals

=== Additional musicians ===
- Hans Ziller - 2nd guitar solo on #01, acoustic slide guitar on #04, lead guitar on #05
- Fred Curci - additional backing vocals

== Charts ==
| Chart (1989) | Peak position |
|---|---|
| German Albums (Offizielle Top 100) | 16 |
| Swedish Albums (Sverigetopplistan) | 49 |
| Swiss Albums (Schweizer Hitparade) | 19 |
| UK Albums (Official Charts) | 74 |

== Covers ==
In 1991, Desmond Child covered the song "The Price of Loving You", which he co-wrote with Schleifer and Lessmann, for his Discipline album.
