= Carl Begai =

Canadian music journalist, and author

- Born: December 1, 1968 (age 57); Toronto, Ontario, Canada
- Occupations: Music Journalist, writer
- Writing career
- Period: 1993–present
- Subjects: Music, Heavy Metal Music
- Website: carlbegai.com

Carl Begai (born December 1, 1968, in Toronto, Ontario) is a Canadian music journalist, and author.

== Life ==
Begai was born in Toronto, Ontario, Canada. He attended York University in Toronto and received a B.A. in history in 1993.

Begai currently lives in Germany.

== Career ==
Begai began his writing career in October 1993 as a contributor to M.E.A.T Magazine, a Toronto-based metal fanzine distributed across Canada that was available for free. At the end of 1996 he joined the ranks of Toronto-based metal magazine Brave Words & Bloody Knuckles (BW&BK). He has contributed to every issue since, having become one of the key writers on staff. In May 2005 Begai added the BW&BK website Bravewords.com to his mag-related duties, joining other staff members in reporting metal news on a daily basis.

Begai has also contributed to the regional German rock fanzine Rock City News (better known these days as RCN) and was a copy editor for the English language edition of the German gothic culture magazine Orkus for two years.

In addition, he has written brief band biographies for Blood Stain Child, Midnattsol, Scarlet Sins, Ahab and vocalist Amanda Somerville. Carl also assisted Midnattsol vocalist Carmen Elise Espenaes in shaping and arranging lyrics for the band's 2005 debut, Where Twilight Dwells, and its 2008 follow-up, Nordlys.

Begai is the co-writer and collaborator on ex-Bonfire bassist Joerg Deisinger's memoir, Fire And Fame, released independently in August 2008. He is currently working on a book of his own entitled Won't Go Quietly, a work of fiction inspired his experiences in the music industry.
