= Cry for Help (EP) =

EP by Bonfire
- Released: 25 May 2012
- Genre: Hard rock
- Length: 24:44
- Label: LZ Records/Sony Music
- Producer: Claus Lessmann/Hans Ziller

Cry for Help is an EP by German hard rock band Bonfire. It was released in 2012 as a charity to prevent animal abuse. It was supported by PETA and specifically combated the Ukrainian government's policy to reward people for killing stray street dogs. The track "Cry for Help" was originally part of the album Double X, but has been re-recorded for this release. The band donated €1 to PETA for each sale made of the EP. Although Dominik Huelshorst was the one whom performed on this release, the band's new drummer, Harry Reischmann, is shown in the music video to the song.

== Track listing ==
No.	Title	Writer(s)	Length
1.	"Cry for Help (Radio Version)"	Claus Lessmann, Hans Ziller	3:32
2.	"Cry for Help (Long Version)"	Lessmann, Ziller	4:17
3.	"Cry for Help (Acoustic Version)"	Lessmann, Ziller	4:17
4.	"You Make Me Feel (Live at Masters of Rock 2011)"	Lessmann, Ziller	5:03
5.	"I Need You (Private Version)"	Lessmann, Ziller	3:38
6.	"Just Follow The Rainbow (Live at Masters of Rock 2011)"	Lessmann, Ziller	3:57

== Band members ==
- Claus Lessmann – lead vocals and rhythm guitar
- Hans Ziller – guitar
- Chris Limburg – guitar
- Uwe Köhler – bass
- Dominik Huelshorst – drums and percussion
