= Joerg Deisinger =

German musician

- Born: Jörg Deisinger; 23 April 1966 (age 60); Nuremberg, West Germany
- Genres: Hard rock, heavy metal
- Occupations: Musician, photographer
- Instruments: Bass guitar, guitar, vocals
- Years active: 1985–2003
- Website: joergdeisinger.com fireandfame.com

Joerg Deisinger (born Jörg Deisinger) is a German photographer, musician and the former bassist and a founding member of the German 1980s heavy metal band Bonfire.

== Early life and Bonfire ==
Deisinger was born in Nuremberg, West Germany, on 23 April 1966. His pre-teen obsession with learning how to play guitar eventually became a full-fledged pursuit of becoming a rock star. When it became clear he had a genuine chance of realizing his dream, Deisinger quit his apprenticeship as an electrician to devote himself to music full-time.

Deisinger joined German hard rock band as a bassist Cacumen in 1985, which would change its name to Bonfire in May 1986 in the interest of having a catchier moniker to push their new album, Don't Touch the Light. The name was suggested by Deisinger and after some consideration replaced Cacumen. He recorded four albums with the band – Don't Touch the Light (1986), Fireworks (1987), Point Blank (1989), and Knock Out (1991). During his time with the band touring Europe extensively with acts such as Victory, Krokus, ZZ Top and Judas Priest. They sold almost 750,000 albums over a four-year period even though the North American market failed to embrace Bonfire as Europe had. Deisinger played his last show with Bonfire on 29 July 1994.

On 3 July 1996, a one-time one-payment offer was made by Claus Lessmann and original Bonfire guitarist Hans Ziller to buy the band name back from Deisinger, guitarist Angel Schleifer and drummer Edgar Patrik, as the trio had no desire to resurrect Bonfire.

== After Bonfire ==
Deisinger went on to record two albums with Paul Sabu (self-titled – 1996, Between the Light – 1998). In 1999 he formed Soul Doctor with Fair Warning singer Tommy Heart, and while the band's 2001 self-titled debut held promise, the 2003 follow-up, Systems Go Wild, suffered from creative differences between Deisinger and Heart. Following its release, Deisinger left the band in April 2003.

In 2003 Deisinger received a Gold record for Bonfire's Fireworks album, which had officially sold 250,000 copies in Germany alone, since its 1987 release.

Deisinger relocated to Thailand in 2004. In addition to doing occasional live gigs as a session player, he opened an English school in Sichon with his girlfriend. In December of that year, the last minute cancellation of a planned Christmas vacation to Koh Phi Phi Don ultimately saved Deisinger's life; the tsunami that decimated parts of Thailand, Indonesia, India, Sri Lanka and Malaysia on 26 December 2004 laid waste to the resort where he was supposed to be staying.

On 17 March 2005 Deisinger returned to Nuremberg, Germany and started working as a freelance photographer, eventually founding Deisinger Photography, which specializes in wedding, travel and event photographs and portfolios.

== Fire and Fame ==
In 2005 Deisinger approached Canadian music journalist and writer Carl Begai about co-writing his memoirs, which focused on his Bonfire career. The project, eventually dubbed Fire and Fame by Carl, wrapped up in late 2007 and was released independently in August 2008.

== Discography ==
=== Bonfire ===
==== Albums ====
- 1986: Don't Touch the Light
- 1987: Fireworks
- 1989: Point Blank
- 1991: Knock Out
- 1993: Live... The Best

==== DVD ====
- 2001: Golden Bullets (DVD, reissue of The Best)

==== Other ====
- 1989: Sword and Stone (Shocker soundtrack)

=== Axel Rudi Pell ===
- 1989: Wild Obsession

=== Sabu ===
- 1996: self-titled
- 1998: Between the Light
- 2003: Resurfaced

=== Soul Doctor ===
- 2001: self-titled
- 2002: Systems Go Wild
