= Strike Ten =

2001 studio album by Bonfire

Studio album by Bonfire
- Released: 9 April 2001
- Recorded: 2000/2001
- Genre: Hard rock
- Length: 57:34
- Label: BMG International
- Producer: Lessmann/Ziller

Bonfire chronology
Who's Foolin' Who (2000)	Strike Ten (2001)	29 Golden Bullets (2001)

Strike Ten is the eighth album by German heavy metal band Bonfire, but the tenth album release, hence the name. It was released in 2001 by BMG International and features a bonus song that was cut from the Fireworks album called "Angel in White", which was also a B-side to the single "Sleeping All Alone".

== Track listing ==
No.	Title	Writer(s)	Length
1.	"Revelation Day"	Claus Lessmann, Hans Ziller	0:41
2.	"Under Blue Skies"	Lessmann, Ziller	5:36
3.	"Strike Back"	Lessmann, Ziller	4:54
4.	"Down to Atlanta"	Lessmann, Ziller	4:02
5.	"Southern Winds"	Lessmann, Ziller	4:51
6.	"Good Time Rock 'N' Roll"	Lessmann, Ziller	5:01
7.	"Until the Last Goodbye"	Lessmann, Ziller	4:32
8.	"Diamonds in the Rough"	Lessmann, Ziller	4:14
9.	"Damn You"	Lessmann, Ziller, Chris Lausmann	4:21
10.	"Anytime You Cry"	Lessmann, Ziller, Lausmann	5:35
11.	"Too Much Hollywood"	Lessmann, Ziller	5:06
12.	"I Need You"	Lessmann, Ziller	4:40
13.	"Angel in White"	Lessmann, Ziller, Horst Maier-Thorn, Joerg Deisinger	4:01

=== Bonus track ===
- Take Me By the Hand (4:07)

== Band members ==
- Claus Lessmann - lead & backing vocals, acoustic guitar
- Hans Ziller - lead, rhythm & acoustic guitars, backing vocals, talk box
- Chris Lausmann - rhythm guitar, keyboards, backing vocals
- Uwe Köhler - bass, backing vocals
- Jürgen Wiehler - drums, backing vocals

== Reception ==
Metal Reviews said, "This new album is for all the fans who love good old Hard-Rock with good riffs and solos, great vocals and who like me love to headbang crazy while you drive."

== Charts ==
Chart (2001)	Peak position
German Albums (Offizielle Top 100)	32
