= Seeing Double =

Seeing Double may refer to:

- Seeing Double (album), a 2002 album by S Club
- Seeing Double (2003 film), a 2003 film starring S Club
- Seeing Double (1913 film), an American silent comedy film
- "Seeing Double" (song), a 1979 song by The Teardrops
- Seeing Double, a 2008 album by Duncan Lloyd
- "Seein' Double", a 2014 song by Nikki Lane from All or Nothin'
- Double Dutchess: Seeing Double, a 2017 visual album by Fergie
- Diplopia or double vision, the simultaneous perception of two images of a single object

== See also ==
- Double vision (disambiguation)
