= Double X (album) =

Studio album by Bonfire
- Released: 26 May 2006
- Recorded: 2006
- Genre: Hard rock
- Length: 62:01
- Label: BMG International
- Producer: Lessmann/Ziller

Bonfire chronology
One Acoustic Night (2005)	Double X (2006)	Double Vision (2007)

Double X is the tenth album by the German hard rock band Bonfire. It was released in 2006 by BMG International. It celebrates 20 years of Bonfire music.

== Track listing ==
No.	Title	Writer(s)	Length
1.	"Day 911"	Claus Lessmann, Hans Ziller	5:43
2.	"But We Still Rock"	Lessmann, Ziller	4:07
3.	"Cry for Help"	Lessmann, Ziller, Jurgen Wiehler, Uwe Kohler	4:35
4.	"Bet Your Bottom Dollar"	Lessmann, Ziller	4:31
5.	"What's on Your Mind?"	Lessmann, Ziller	4:16
6.	"Blink of an Eye"	Lessmann, Ziller	6:09
7.	"Rap Is Crap!"	Lessmann, Ziller, Wiehler, Kohler	3:49
8.	"Notion of Love"	Lessmann, Ziller, Wiehler, Kohler	3:33
9.	"Right Things Right"	Lessmann, Ziller, Wiehler, Kohler	3:55
10.	"Hard to Say"	Lessmann, Ziller	3:52
11.	"Wings to Fly"	Lessmann, Ziller	4:43
12.	"So What?"	Lessmann, Ziller	4:39
13.	"Blink of an Eye (Extended Version)"	Lessmann, Ziller	7:49
14.	"R.I.C."	Lessmann, Ziller	0:20

== Personnel ==
- Claus Lessmann - lead vocals, rhythm guitar
- Hans Ziller - lead, rhythm & acoustic guitars
- Chris Limburg - rhythm guitar
- Uwe Köhler - bass
- Jürgen Wiehler - drums, percussion

== Reception ==
Metal Reviews said, "I'm very encouraged by this release. Although Bonfire don't completely go from the scrap heap to pulling a classic out of their pocket, Double X is solid comeback."
