= Brave Words & Bloody Knuckles =

Canadian heavy metal magazine

- Brave Words & Bloody Knuckles issue #104
- Editor-in-chief: Martin Popoff
- Categories: Heavy metal music
- Frequency: 10/year
- First issue: March 1994
- Final issue: January/February 2009 (print)
- Country: Canada
- Based in: Toronto
- Language: English
- Website: bravewords.com
- ISSN: 1705-3781
- OCLC: 57191652

Brave Words & Bloody Knuckles (BW&BK) is a Canadian heavy metal website and former magazine. Although based in Toronto, Canada, BW&BK features writers from the US, Germany and the UK, allowing the magazine to represent metal music from an international prospective.

Covering many facets of extreme music, BW&BK features a reviews section which reports on current records circulating through the underground metal world, a Metal Forecast section which tracks the release date of upcoming recordings, and a website (named just BraveWords) which reports current metal news. Brave Words & Bloody Knuckles was founded by former M.E.A.T. magazine staffer Tim Henderson and author Martin Popoff in 1994. The magazine published its last issue in January 2009, but continues online as the BraveWords website, which was launched in 2000.

== History ==
=== Early 1990s ===
Henderson, who had published several photocopied issues of a newsletter called Metal Tim Bits (the title a play on the Tim Bit donut served at the popular Canadian coffee chain Tim Hortons), encountered Popoff in the Toronto HMV's metal section and Popoff began discussing his first metal book, Riff Kills Man. The two subsequently plotted a magazine creation based on Metal Tim Bits; the Brave Words & Bloody Knuckles title was based on Agony Column's 1990 album of the same name.

=== First issue (March 1994) ===
200 copies of BW&BK #1 were originally printed, and its cover price was $1.95. HMV stocked the magazine and other record stores followed suit. Issue #1 was 16 pages, and featured interviews with Pantera, Entombed, Gwar, Cannibal Corpse and Geezer Butler of Black Sabbath. No ads appeared in the inaugural issue.

=== 1994–1997 ===
BW&BK continued to grow, reaching 48 pages by October 1997. In the interim, the magazine had interviewed Slayer, Alex Lifeson of Rush (an interview conducted in Lifeson's living room), Metallica's Jason Newsted and Lars Ulrich, Megadeth, Mercyful Fate, Iron Maiden, Fear Factory, Cradle of Filth, Venom, Annihilator and others. By this time, current writers Carl Begai, Chris Bruni, Mark Gromen, Allan Grusie and Aaron Small had joined the team.

=== Late 1997 ===
BW&BK #21 was the first issue of the magazine to feature a colour cover. Inside the issue, interviews with Ozzy Osbourne and AC/DC were featured, while Metallica's ReLoad was chastised in BW&BK's Cross-Fire review section.

=== 1998–1999 ===
A new layout team, Hugues Laflamme and Angie Aue, joined the magazine. Events in this period include interviews with Slayer, Sepultura, Gene Simmons of Kiss, Death, Morbid Angel, Emperor, In Flames (in celebration of Gothenburg, Sweden's then-rising scene), Rhapsody, Hypocrisy, Witchery and a chat with Janie Hendrix (administrator of the Jimi Hendrix vaults).

A large piece focusing on Canadian metal bands was also printed, a reflection of BW&BK's Canadian roots. A Top Metal Albums of the '80s feature also surfaced around this time. The magazine also included a CD, Brave Words & Bloody Knuckles Proudly Presents Blood Tracks II, with the February 1999 edition.

=== 2000–2001 ===
Chronicling the rise of power metal, BW&BK printed interviews with Rob Halford, Demons & Wizards, Stratovarius and Eidolon. Entombed's comeback album, Uprising, put the band on the cover of issue #39. AC/DC was once again featured in the magazine, while Iron Maiden, In Flames, Rob Halford, Hypocrisy, Nevermore, The Haunted, Dimmu Borgir, Annihilator and Dimebag Darrell all featured on the magazine cover throughout the year. Writers Alex S. Johnson, David Perri and Greg Pratt also joined the fold.

=== 2002–2003 ===
BW&BK was by this time distributed in 23 countries. Cover features included Led Zeppelin, Metallica and Rush alongside mainstays Opeth, Dimmu Borgir and Slayer.

BW&BK debuted the Brave Picks soundcheck in its reviews section, asking individual writers to rate the month's most relevant albums, and then publishing average scores based on all the writers' grades.

=== 2004–2005 ===
In 2004, BW&BK celebrated its tenth anniversary. The covers over this annum included first-time appearances from Megadeth, Children of Bodom (one of BW&BK's top-selling issues), Fear Factory, Behemoth, Soulfly, Kataklysm, Candlemass and Gene Simmons of Kiss. Classic strongholds Judas Priest and Black Sabbath were also given the main page.

In 2005, BW&BK once again spotlighted Canadian metal, this time creating an incomplete A-Z list of all active, signed Canadian metal bands. Current writer Dom Lawson began contributing to BW&BK.

=== 2006–present ===
The 100th issue of the BW&BK was released in October 2006. Filled with personal reflections from Henderson and the rest of the magazine's staff, issue #100 also included a congratulatory autographs from some of well-known metal musicians (all autographs were requested in person by BW&BK staff members). In addition, issue #100 showcased a re-print of BW&BK #1, a nod to the magazine's roots. Issue #100's cover featured Motörhead frontman Lemmy cutting a BW&BK birthday cake.

In conjunction with BW&BK #100, the magazine held a birthday party at Montreal's Les Foufounes Électriques concert venue/nightclub and also produced the fourth installment of its annual 6-Pack metal festival.

Also in 2006, Voivod, Sepultura and Satyricon appeared on the covers, and Lamb of God and Trivium's faces closed out the year.

2007 began with a piece on Heaven & Hell and commercial black metallists Dimmu Borgir gracing the cover of the magazine once again.

The final print issue of the magazine was published in January 2009, citing declining advertising revenues and its small readership, but the website BraveWords kept going.

=== 6-Pack Festival ===
BW&BK organized and put on the BW&BK 6 Pack Festival in Cleveland, USA in the spring of 2003, 2004 and 2005. The festival featured, over the years, Falconer, Katatonia, Candlemass, Trouble, Soilwork, and Kataklysm, Shadowkeep.

2006's incarnation of the 6 Pack Festival was held in Montreal, Canada on October 14 at Le Medley. The line-up included Testament, Brutal Truth, Dismember, Grave, Camilla Rhodes and Torn Within. The pre-show party was also held in Montreal on October 13 at Foufounes Electriques, and the Foufounes event also celebrated the 100th issue of BW&BK.

== See also ==
- List of music magazines
