= Solemnity (band) =

German heavy metal band

Solemnity is a German heavy metal band.

Founded by "Sven the Axe", the lyrical universe of the band centres around horror. Solemnity also emphasized the visual show at their concerts. Solemnity changed all their members in 2004 and then 2007, when they added two new guitarists and a drummer.

== Discography ==
- Reign in Hell (2002)
- King of Dreams (2003, Remedy Records)
- Shockwave of Steel (2005)
- Another Bloody Sabbath (EP, 2006)
- Lords of the Damned (2008)
- Circle of Power (2012)

The band also contributed to tribute albums for Cirith Ungol and Running Wild. In 2007, Solemnity, together with Bamberg Symphony Orchestra, released a classical version of Bathory's "One Rode to Asa Bay".
