= Knock Out (Bonfire album) =

Studio album by Bonfire
- Released: 17 September 1991
- Recorded: 1991
- Genre: Hard rock
- Length: 59:01
- Label: BMG
- Producer: Mack

Bonfire chronology
Point Blank (1989)	Knock Out (1991)	Glaub dran (1993)

Knock Out is the fourth album by the German hard rock band Bonfire. It was released in 1991 on the label BMG International.

== Track listing ==
No.	Title	Writer(s)	Length
1.	"Streets of Freedom"	Angel Schleifer, Claus Lessmann	4:58
2.	"The Stroke"	Billy Squier	4:25
3.	"Dirty Love"	Joerg Deisinger, Schleifer, Lessmann	3:51
4.	"Rivers of Glory"	Schleifer, Lessmann	4:54
5.	"Home Babe"	Schleifer, Lessmann	4:57
6.	"Shake Down"	Deisinger, Schleifer, Lessmann	3:04
7.	"Hold You"	Schleifer, Lessmann	4:20
8.	"Down and Out"	Schleifer, Lessmann	3:39
9.	"Take My Heart and Run"	Lessmann, Michael Voss-Schon	5:55
10.	"All We Got"	Deisinger, Schleifer, Lessmann	4:42
11.	"Fight for Love"	Schleifer, Lessmann	5:14
12.	"Tonmeister"	Edgar Patrik, Deisinger, Schleifer, Lessmann, Reinhold Mack	9:02

== Band members ==
- Claus Lessmann - lead & backing vocals, acoustic guitar
- Angel Schleifer - guitar, backing vocals
- Joerg Deisinger - bass, backing vocals
- Edgar Patrik - drums, percussion, backing vocals

== Charts ==
Chart (1991)	Peak position
German Albums (Offizielle Top 100)	44
Swiss Albums (Schweizer Hitparade)	29
