= Bonfire (band) =

German rock band

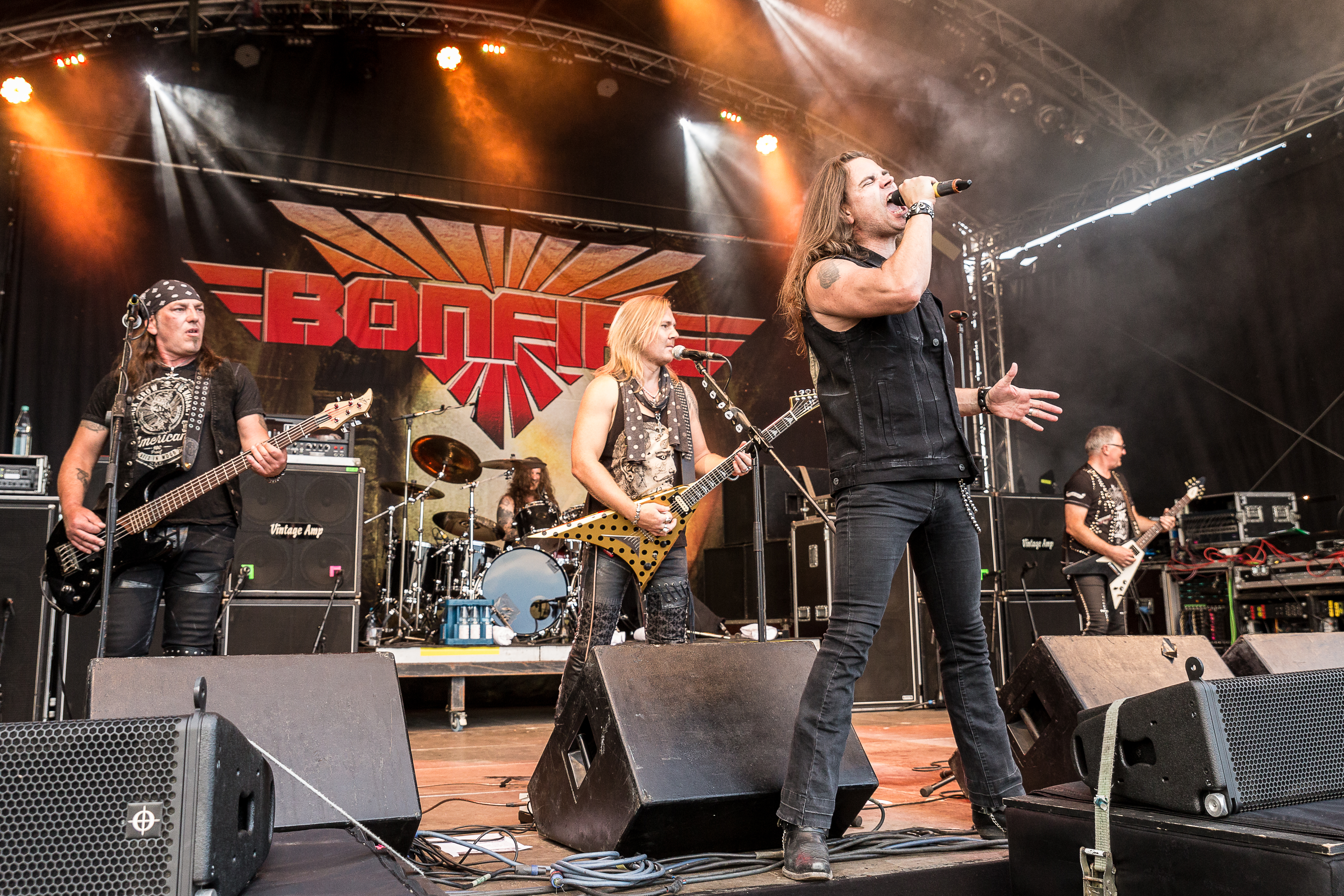
- Bonfire at Metal Frenzy 2019

Background information
- Also known as: Cacumen, Lessmann/Ziller, Ex, EZ Livin'
- Origin: Ingolstadt, Germany
- Genres: Hard rock, heavy metal
- Years active: 1972–1985 (as Cacumen), 1986–present (as Bonfire)
- Labels: BMG, RCA, Sony, LZ, Universal, HÁrt, UDR/Warner
- Members: Hans Ziller; Frank Pané; Ronnie Parkes; Fabio Alessandrini; Dyan
- Past members: Hans Zehetbauer; Alfons Schlamp; Karl Ziller; Hanns Schmidt-Theißen; Hans Hauptmann; Hans Forstner; Robert Prskalowicz; Horst Maier-Thorn; David Reece; Angel Schleifer; Joerg Deisinger; Edgar Patrik; Chris Lausmann; Jürgen "Bam Bam" Wiehler; Dominik Hülshorst; Claus Lessmann; Chris "Yps" Limburg; Uwe Köhler; Harry Reischmann; Michael Bormann; Andrè Hilgers; Tim Breideband; Alexx Stahl
- Website: bonfire.de

Bonfire (originally Cacumen) is a German hard rock/heavy metal band, founded by Hans Ziller in Ingolstadt, Upper Bavaria in 1972. In 1986, the band changed its name to Bonfire. Ziller remains a member and owns the rights of the name "Bonfire".

== Biography ==
=== Cacumen (1972–1986) ===
In 1972 in the Bavarian town of Ingolstadt the teenaged guitarist Hans Ziller, put together a rock band called Cacumen with his guitarist brother Karl and gathered a bunch of friends to complete the band. The name of the group was taken from a school test Hans had done and it translates from Latin as "the top of a mountain". For the next six years, the band played in small local venues, but formed a fan base in their hometown. In 1978, the group consisted of Hans and Karl on guitars, Horst Maier on guitar (in 1983, Maier's last name would become Maier-Thorn), Hans Hauptmann on bass and Hans Forstner on drums. When the band started searching for a replacement singer, Claus Lessmann, a fellow student of Hans', was hired.

Lessmann previously had performed in the bands Ginger and Sunset and was known for his harmonic vocals and he fit in perfectly with Cacumen. With this line-up, the band had a chance to start branching out to venues outside Ingolstadt. The band recorded a single in 1979 called "Riding Away", which featured the song "Wintertale" on the flip side. The group used this opportunity to begin touring in clubs, schools and even in parking lots. The fan base grew and Cacumen was finally signed to an independent label. By then though, Karl Ziller had departed the group. The self-titled Cacumen album was released in 1981 and featured a new version of "Riding Away".

Eventually Cacumen got in contact with Hanns Schmidt-Theissen, who owned a small music studio. Schmidt-Theissen had played with the group on the "Riding Away" single and was supporting the band at live venues on keyboards. Since money was poor and Schmidt-Theissen was willing to help, they recorded the album Bad Widow at his studio in Rodgau, Germany in 1982. Schmidt-Theissen helped the group to get a contract, and was successful at the time.

Meanwhile, the fan base of the band was growing as was the number of performance dates. In 1983, Robert Prskalowicz replaced Hans Hauptmann on bass and this group became the best-known Cacumen formation, but when they signed with BMG, the group had had a total make-over. Prskalowicz and Hans Forstner were no longer with the group as of March 1985. They departed because they could not commit to the group full-time and were replaced with Joerg Deisinger on bass, previously from Rascal and Dynasty, while Dominik Hülshorst from Darxon became the new drummer. The band updated also their image, donning the standard look of an 80s hard rock group. Finally, the company requested a name change, as they found Cacumen was too hard for the average customer to pronounce and not a very marketable name. After a brain storming session, the new name selected was Bonfire, which came into effect in May 1986.

=== Bonfire, the first coming (1986–1994) ===
Bonfire's worldwide debut album was released in June 1986 with the title Don't Touch the Light. During the recording of the follow-up album in May 1987, Hülshorst was fired due to musical differences and Bonfire proceeded to release their next album Fireworks as a quartet, with the drums played by Ken Mary from the American heavy metal band Fifth Angel. Two versions of this album exist, the worldwide version and the North American version, which cover features the four members and contains the song "You Make Me Feel" from the first album.

Between the second and third albums, Bonfire went through many changes. Although Tommy Wagner filled the drum kit for a TV spot, the band needed a new full-time drummer, which appeared in December 1987, when Edgar Patrik from Sinner, Samson and Tyran Pace joined. In July 1988, during the Fireworks Tour, Maier had to leave due to his rheumatism becoming too much of a crippling factor to play guitar and be on stage. Taking his spot in August was Angel Schleifer, formerly of Doc Savage, Red Alert, Sinner, Mad Max, Pretty Maids and Helter Skelter. The tour went on and once it was completed, the band settled down to collaborate for a new album. It was then that Hans Ziller had problems with the record company and the band's management due in part to his family commitments at the time. Against the band's better decisions, he was fired from the group for not having his focus on the band and in June 1989 and Bonfire carried on as a quartet. Bonfire's first two albums were the only ones released commercially in North America.

Despite the business decision, Lessmann and Ziller maintained a great friendship. When Ziller formed his own group, Lessmann was asked to write songs as well as perform vocals. The record company's policy did not allow him to do so, leaving Ziller the task to find a replacement singer for his new band, EZ Livin'.

The decision to remove Ziller from Bonfire began to show on Lessmann, who had remained in the band. After many attempts to break through in the North American scene and what he thought was a disappointing fourth album, Lessmann left the band on 25 September 1992. His announcement was not a total shock to the rest of the band, but it did leave them with the dilemma of who would take his place. One vocalist that had the group's attention was Michael Bormann, who was singing for Letter X and had his own side-group called Jaded Heart. Moreover, he was previously in High Voltage and the J.R. Blackmore Group. Even though he was willing to sing with Bonfire, he was committed to his other two projects so the group continued looking. The unsuccessful attempt to find a full-time vocalist led to Bormann becoming the new frontman of Bonfire in March 1993. Although he did leave Letter X, he maintained his band Jaded Heart.

Despite the new singer, Bonfire were in a rut now. Their record company refused to release any new material that did not have Lessmann singing and the years of grunge music had started. The band felt that the end was in sight and released a live album featuring concert recordings from the Point Blank Tour with Lessmann on vocals. The album Bormann had sung on was shelved (but later released as a bootleg called Bonfire – End of an Era Demos) and Bonfire performed for the last time on 29 July 1994 without officially breaking up.

=== Claus and Hans – Lessmann/Ziller to Ex (1992–1996) ===
While Bonfire was trying to carry on with their new lead vocalist, Lessmann and Ziller reunited in 1992 to form the project Lessmann/Ziller, after Hans Ziller had disbanded EZ Livin'. In 1993, they released the German sung EP Glaub dran. The EP was followed by a few single releases of songs that were not on the initial recording. The project had limited success, not as was initially expected. In 1995, Lessmann/Ziller evolved to become a group called Ex, which in May featured Joerg Deisinger on bass and Dominik Hülshorst on drums, almost a reunion of the 1986 Bonfire line-up. EX was a good band, but Lessmann and Ziller realized that the only means of recapturing their old fan base was under the name Bonfire.

=== The Return of Bonfire – Charade emerges (1996–2000) ===
In 1996 Lessmann and Ziller decided to start legal proceedings to get the rights to the Bonfire name as well as to the music from 1986 to 1992. On 3 July, a one-time payment was made to the last Bonfire members of 1994 and Lessmann and Ziller renamed their Ex project to Bonfire. The second coming began with the reissue of Glaub dran with other songs in English in 1996. In 1997 they hired Chris Lausmann on guitar and keyboards, who had played with Affair and Frontline; Uwe Köhler on bass, formally from Black Tears, Paradise Leaf, Big Apple, Lipstikk, Blitzkrieg and British Steel; and finally Jurgen Wiehler on drums, who had played with Backdoor Affair, Heaven Sent, Chain Reaction, Loud & Proud, EZ Livin', Parish Garden, Wet Paint and 88 Crash.

Also in 1997 Michael Bormann and Angel Schleifer got back together and wanted to release the shelved Bonfire album they had recorded in 1993. Joerg Deisinger was not interested and Edgar Patrik had other commitments, so the reunion was only for the duo composed by Bormann and Schleifer. Because of the change of ownership for the Bonfire name, Bormann and Schleifer decided to call themselves Charade. The shelved album was released in 1998 in Japan, becoming a highly sought after CD. The partnership between Bormann and Schleifer ended in May 2011, releasing 2 albums in total.

=== Worldwide exposure (2001–2014) ===
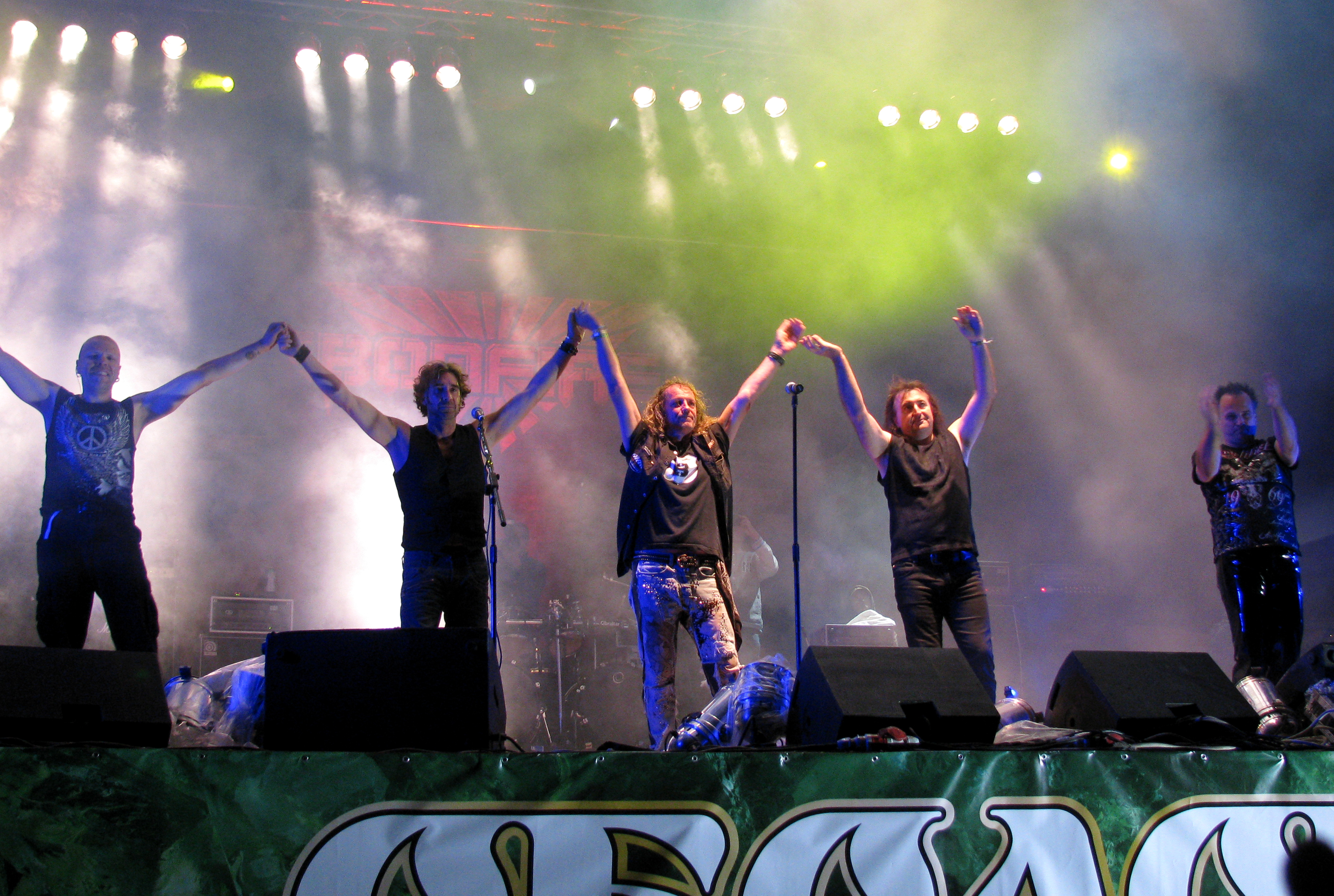
Bonfire at Global East Rock Festival 2010

Since 1996 Bonfire has released at least one album a year and their fan base has grown, surpassing their 1980s popularity. In 2002, Lausmann left the group, but that did not stop the band. In 2004, after successfully gaining the rights to their pre-Bonfire material, the band released a five-part CD series called The Early Days. Parts 1, 2 and 3 were the reissuing of the Cacumen albums, part 4 was the EZ Livin' album and part 5 was the Lessmann/Ziller album, every one of them featuring bonus material.

In 2006 Bonfire celebrated their 20th anniversary with Chris Limburg from Vice, Wet Paint and Lustfinger in the role of co-guitarist. In 2008, Bonfire released a rock opera album called The Räuber. A special DVD of the opera performance that also featured new music videos of several of the songs from the album was released soon afterwards, including a remixed version of the song "You Make Me Feel". The new version of the song is featured on the video game SingStar.

2009 saw the return of yet another original member of Bonfire. Jürgen Wiehler left the band unexpectedly and was replaced with the returning Dominik Hülshorst on 15 January. This was followed by the long anticipated return to the North American stage as the band performed at the Rocklahoma Festival on 12 July in Pryor, Oklahoma, US. In 2010, on 25 March, Bonfire signed to a major label again, this time with Universal Music, with hopes that they would be handled and promoted much better than BMG did in the 1980s. Unfortunately this partnership lasted only a few months. They released the single "Deutsche National Hymne" for the 2010 FIFA World Cup in South Africa, remaining on the German Top 50 Single Charts for seven weeks.

In 2011 the band released Branded as a studio album, which also made the German album charts. This was followed up with a complete live performance release of their 1987 album, Fireworks, entitled Fireworks Still Alive. Dominik Hülshorst's stay with Bonfire unfortunately was short, ending in March 2012. He was replaced by Gregorian drummer Harry Reischmann.

=== New line-up (2015–present) ===
It was announced on 11 January by a member of Bonfire's public relations team, with direct quotes from Hans Ziller, that Bonfire had gone through a great change for 2015. According to an e-mail that was sent out to fans by Willi Wrede, a falling out had occurred between long time singer Claus Lessmann and founder member Ziller that resulted in "an ending" to the band. The web site known as melodicrock.com had already published the news two days prior that this had happened with addition information that former Accept and Bangalore Choir vocalist David Reece would be taking on the vocal duties and recording a new album with the group. The e-mail by Wrede went into further details of what had occurred. Lessmann and Chris Limburg no longer had the desire to continue and Uwe Köhler had also decided to leave the group and pursue a new course in music with another band. Ziller had wanted to carry on with Harry Reischmann (drums) and so hired Reece as well as Ronnie Parkes (Bass) from Seven Witches These musicians for the year of 2014 were performing together as EZ Livin', a solo venture by Ziller while Bonfire had taken a break. The new second guitarist of Bonfire is Frank Pané, member of the German metal band Solemnity and ex-member of Red to Grey, and Valley's Eve.

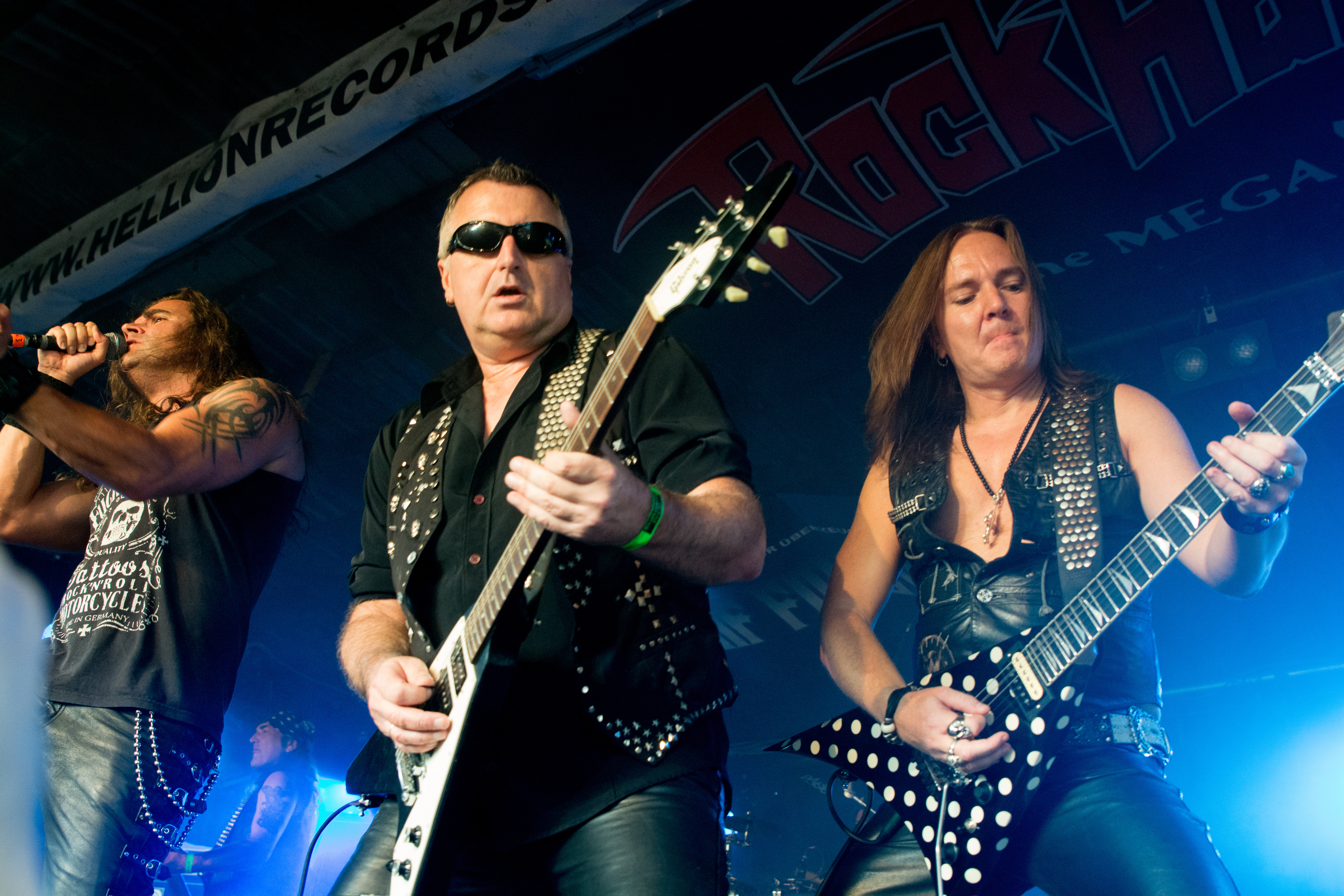
Bonfire at Headbangers Open Air 2016

In 2016, Bonfire celebrated their 30th anniversary and a new double album, Pearls, released on UDR/Warner on 18 March 2016. This recording featured past band hits that were re-recorded. At the beginning of July it was announced that Reece and the band had mutually agreed to part ways. To fill in the vacancy Michael Bormann was announced as the new frontman, but he was not able to join the group for a few months. Alexx Stahl of Purple Rising and Roxxcalibur agreed to be a temporary singer to fulfill the band's commitments until Bormann's arrival. During that time the group agreed that Stahl put a lot of effort in to the performances, so it was agreed all around that he would become the full-time lead vocalist.

Alexx said about the beginning of the cooperation:

"I received a call in summer 2016. Bonfire was looking for a spare singer for the ongoing tour because David Reece was out. I saw that I could get some good promotion for me and my other bands there so I joined Bonfire for 16 shows. I had only 10 days to learn the whole live set but it worked."

== Members ==
Current members

- Hans Ziller – lead and rhythm guitars, talkbox, backing vocals (1972–1989, 1996–present)
- Frank Pané – rhythm and lead guitars, backing vocals (2015–present)
- Ronnie Parkes – bass, backing vocals (2015–present)
- Fabio Alessandrini – drums, percussion (2022–present)
- DYAN – lead vocals (2022–present)

== Discography ==
=== Cacumen ===
- 1979: "Riding Away" (single)
- 1981: Cacumen
- 1983: Bad Widow
- 1984: Down to Hell
- 1985: Longing for You (EP)

=== Bonfire (1986–present) ===
==== Studio albums ====
- 1986: Don't Touch the Light
- 1987: Fireworks
- 1989: Point Blank
- 1991: Knock Out
- 1996: Feels Like Comin' Home
- 1997: Rebel Soul
- 1999: Fuel to the Flames
- 2001: Strike Ten
- 2003: Free
- 2006: Double X
- 2008: The Räuber
- 2011: Branded
- 2015: Glorious
- 2017: Byte the Bullet
- 2018: Temple of Lies
- 2018: Legends
- 2020: Fistful of Fire
- 2025: Higher Ground

==== Live albums ====
- 1993: Live...The Best
- 2002: Live Over Europe!
- 2005: One Acoustic Night
- 2007: Double Vision
- 2011: Fireworks Still Alive
- 2013: Live in Wacken
- 2019: Live on Holy Ground. Wacken 2018

==== Compilation albums ====
- 1997: Hot & Slow
- 2000: Who's Foolin' Who
- 2001: 29 Golden Bullets
- 2004: The Early Days
- 2009: You Make Me Feel
- 2013: Schanzerherz
- 2016: Pearls
- 2021: Roots
- 2023: MMXXIII

==== Singles ====
- 1989: "Sword and Stone"
- 1998: "Because It's Christmas Time"
- 2003: "Tell Me What U Know"
- 2004: "Schanzer Herz"
- 2010: "Deutsche Nationalhymne"
- 2012: Cry for Help (EP)
- 2012: "Treueband"
- 2024: "I died tonight"

=== Lessmann/Ziller ===
- 1993: Glaub dran
- 1994: "Charlie & Louise" (single)
- 1994: "Für dich" (single)

=== Ex ===
- 1995: "Die Antwort weiss der Wind" (single)

=== Charade ===
- 1998: Charade
- 2004: II

=== EZ Livin' ===
- 1991: After the Fire
- 2014: Firestorm

== Side projects ==
This does not count what former members have done since leaving Cacumen and Bonfire.

Joerg Deisinger had played on the 1989 album, entitled Wild Obsession, by Axel Rudi Pell. While a part of EX he started the band known as Sabu.

Claus Lessmann was planned to be the lead singer of EZ Livin' while still maintaining membership in Bonfire in 1990. Problems arose and he stayed with Bonfire, but he recorded some demos, which appeared on Bonfire – The Early Days Part 4.

Michael Bormann, when he joined Bonfire in 1993, maintained his membership in Jaded Heart and also was involved with a recording by the J.R. Blackmore Group. During the time Charade existed from 1997 to 2011, he was still with Jaded Heart until 2004 doing five albums in that time. He has been involved with other projects since then as well. The Sygnet until 2000 with one album; being a soloist since 2002 (four albums up to 2011); created the band known as Rain in 1997 and disbanded by 2008 (two albums); part of Biss (2002–2004) doing one album; 20th Century Boys (2003–2004) with one release. This was followed with Zeno (2005–present) with one album; The Trophy (2006–present) one album; and Bloodbound (2007) also one album. He has been with Redrum since 2004 with one album in 2007 and Idea (2003–present). During his VERY brief time with Bonfire in 2016, Michael was still associated with Zeno, The Trophy, Redrum, Idea, Powerworld, Grindhouse and Silent Force as well as remaining a soloist.

Hans Ziller, when Bonfire took a break in 2014, resurrected EZ Livin' temporarily for one release. The group was then rebranded to become the third incarnation of Bonfire.

Chris Lausmann's former band, Frontline, reunited in 2000. He stayed with them until 2002 that included two albums. He also had a project with Frontline vocalist Stephen Kaemmerer called Revolution, but nothing came of that.

Uwe Köhler joined Affair in 1999 and the group released an album in 2002. News from the band's website states a new album is in the works with a new membership line-up but it is unknown if Köhler is still a member.

Jürgen Wiehler was part of the punk-rock band known as Lustfinger from 2002 to 2012, appearing on a couple of albums. He was listed as a member of The Scovilles (2004–2008) and has been a member of the industrial metal band Megaherz since 2007.

Angel Schleifer, since Charade came into existence, was part of Sabu until 1998 and a short reunion in 2003, that included two albums, but he and Paul Sabu have worked together on one of Paul's solo albums. He was also involved with Demon Drive until 2001 with one album and has contributed to the two albums done by the Voices of Rock project spanning from 2007 to 2009.

Harry Reischmann, during his time with Bonfire, was involved with AXEperience, Solemnity until 2012, Gregorian, Skibbie, Rock The Big Band and even was part of Hans Ziller's resurrected EZ Livin', which became the third incarnation of Bonfire.

David Reece was with the following groups while he was involved with Bonfire: Tango Down, Wicked Sensation, Reece Percudani Group and has done some solo work.

Ronnie Parkes has been with Tango Down and Seven Witches since joining Bonfire.

Frank Pane joined Bonfire but maintained his membership in Purpendicular and AXEperience along with his own solo effort. He has since started a band called Sainted Sinners.

Tim Breideband joined Bonfire while still maintaining his position in Roughhouse.

Alexx Stahl, upon joining Bonfire, maintained his membership in Purple Rising and Roxxcalibur.
