= Claus Lessmann =

German singer and guitarist

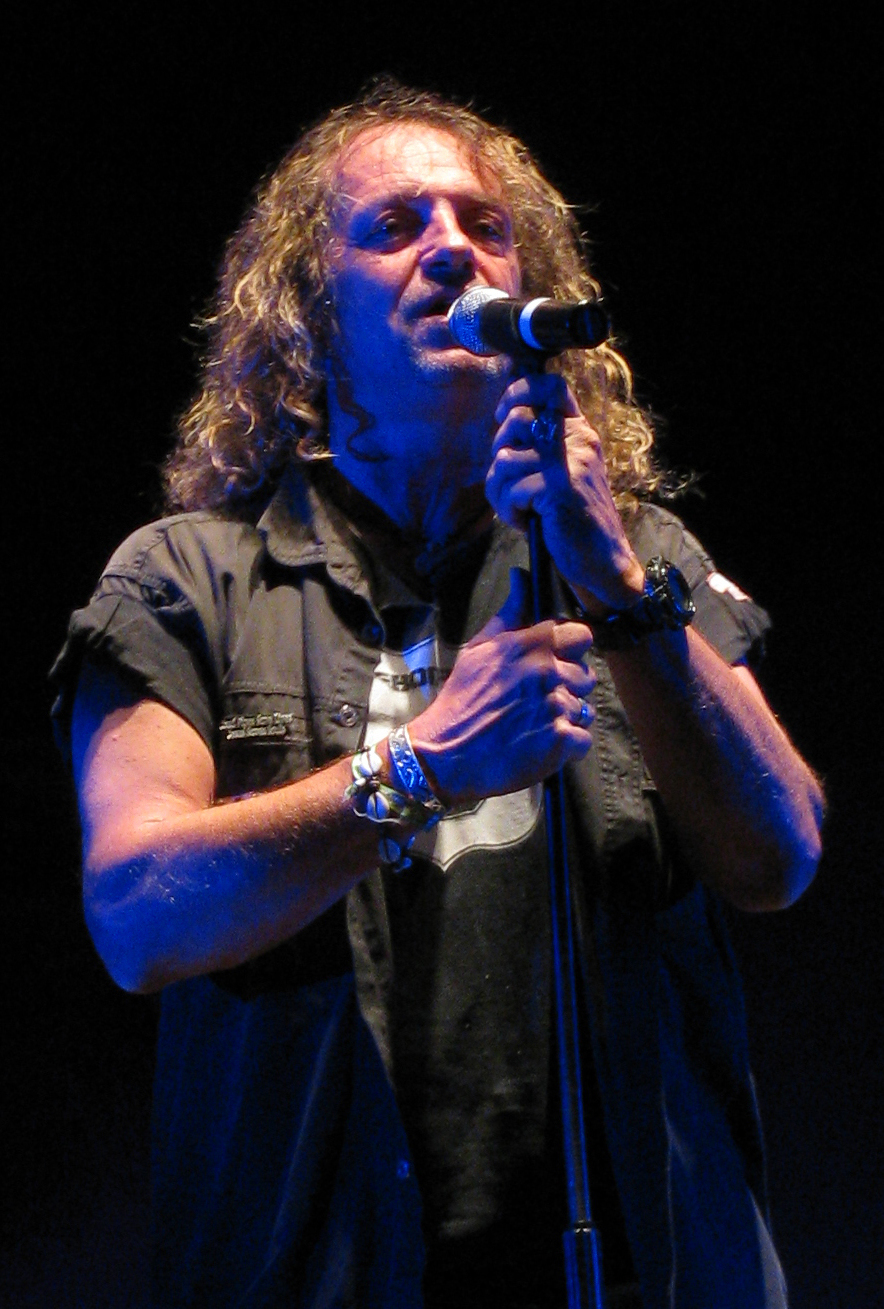
- Lessmann in 2010

Background information
- Born: 11 September 1960 (age 64)
- Genres: Rock, hard rock, heavy metal
- Occupation(s): Singer, musician, songwriter
- Instrument(s): Vocals, guitar
- Years active: 1978–present

Claus Lessmann (born 11 September 1960) is a German heavy metal musician and former lead singer of heavy metal band Bonfire. He is the only member and singer of Bonfire to have appeared on all of the band's albums through 2015, when he left Bonfire. Lessmann was also one of the two original members of the band until January 2015, the other being lead guitarist Hans Ziller. Before joining Bonfire in 1978, he was in the bands Ginger and Sunset. He is currently the vocalist for Phantom 5. Phantom 5 has released two albums.
