= Hans Ziller =

German guitarist

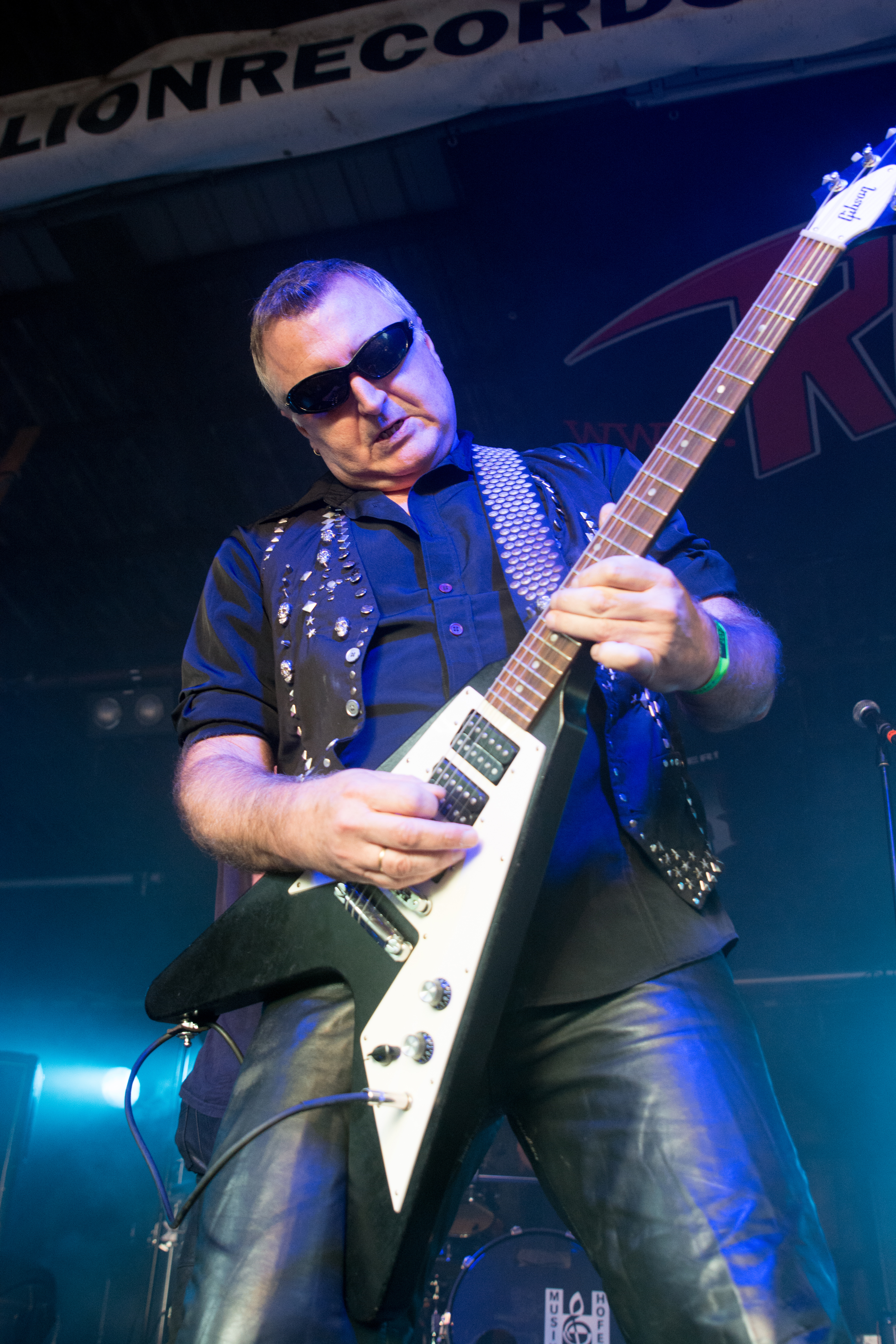
- Ziller in 2016

Background information
- Born: 18 May 1959 (age 65)
- Genres: Rock, hard rock, heavy metal
- Occupation(s): Musician, songwriter
- Instrument: Guitar
- Years active: 1972–present
- Member of: Bonfire

Hans Ziller (born 18 May 1959) is a German musician, known as the founder, lead guitarist, backing vocalist and primary composer of the 1980s melodic hard rock band Bonfire. He founded the band Cacumen (a predecessor of Bonfire) as a teenager in 1972. In 1989, in the middle of working on Bonfire's third album Point Blank—which, like the earlier albums, was produced by Michael Wagener—Ziller left the band because of insurmountable differences with the management and the rest of the band and began a project of his own called EZ Livin'. In 1996, he returned to Bonfire.

In 2014, Ziller resurrected EZ Livin' for a solo venture that was originally planned to be temporary. On 11 January 2015, he reformed Bonfire. The initial album of the new line-up, Glörious, made the German top 50 German album charts, and at the end of 2015, Ziller signed a new contract with the UDR/Warner label. In 2016, Bonfire released the album Pearls on UDR to commemorate the 30th anniversary of the band and embarked on an extended tour to promote the album.
