= The Gaslight Anthem discography =

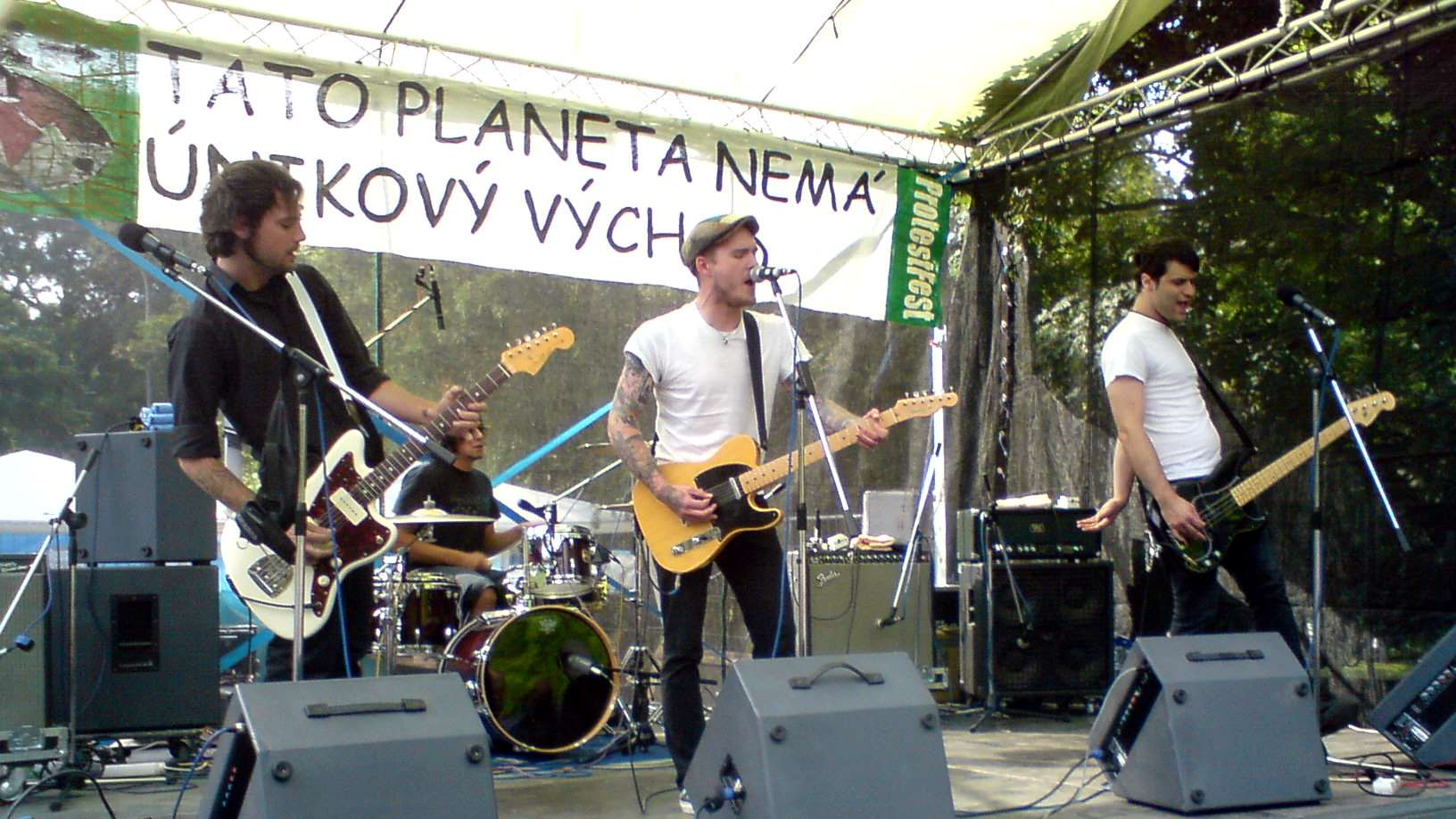
- The Gaslight Anthem performing live at Protofest in Brno, Czech Republic
- Studio albums: 6
- Extended plays: 6
- Live albums: 2
- Compilation albums: 3
- Singles: 22
- Music videos: 16
- Other appearances: 7
- DVD: 1

American rock band the Gaslight Anthem has released six studio albums, three extended plays, twenty-two singles and sixteen music videos. The members are Brian Fallon (vocals and guitar), Alex Rosamilia (guitar), Alex Levine (bass), and Benny Horowitz (drums/percussion).

The band's debut album Sink or Swim did not rank on any major music charts, and no singles were garnered. In February 2008 the Gaslight Anthem released the Señor and the Queen EP. The '59 Sound, the band's second album and first for SideOneDummy, was released in August 2008 and debuted at number seventy on the US Billboard 200 and fifty-five on the UK Albums Chart, and went Gold in the UK. Four singles were released, with the title track reaching number one hundred fifteen on the UK Singles Chart. While on tour with Rise Against, Thrice, and Alkaline Trio in early 2009, the band released a live EP Live at Park Ave..

In 2010, the Gaslight Anthem released their third album and last for SideOne Dummy, American Slang. The album reached number sixteen in the US and eighteen in the UK. The album's title track was one of three singles released and had minor success in Canada but failed to chart in the US. Handwritten, the band's fourth album and debut on Mercury Records, was released in 2012 and became the band's biggest charting success to date reaching number 3 in the US, number 2 in the UK. It also produced two singles including the band's highest charting single, "45", which reached number 11 on the Alternative Songs chart in the US and number seven in Canada. That same year, in celebration of Record Store Day, the band released Hold You Up, a limited edition three song EP and a four song EP for the single, Here Comes My Man exclusively in the UK. 2013 saw the release of Singles Collection: 2008-2011, a box set containing the singles and b-sides from their second and third albums, and the band's first DVD, Live in London.

In early 2014 the band released The B-Sides, a collection of studio outtakes, live songs and acoustic songs recorded from 2008-2011 and released their fifth album, Get Hurt on Island Records in August 2014.

In April 2023, the band released the single, "Positive Charge". It was the band's first new music in nine years and was the first single from the band's sixth studio album, History Books, which was released in October 2023.

The large majority of the band's releases are in vinyl and CD formats, with some exclusively on vinyl.

== Albums ==
=== Studio albums ===
List of albums, with selected chart positions and certifications
Title	Album details	Peak chart positions										Certifications
Title	Album details	US	AUS	AUT	BEL	CAN	GER	IRE	NLD	SWI	UK	Certifications
Sink or Swim	Released: May 29, 2007; Label: XOXO (XOXO009); Format: CD, LP	—	—	—	—	—	—	—	—	—	—	
The '59 Sound	Released: August 19, 2008; Label: SideOneDummy; Format: CD, LP, digital download	70	— (Note: The '59 Sound did not enter the Australian ARIA Albums Chart but peaked at number 12 on the ARIA Hitseekers Chart.)	—	—	—	—	—	—	—	55	BPI: Gold
American Slang	Released: June 15, 2010; Label: SideOneDummy; Format: CD, LP, digital download	16	67	33	54	12	8	15	44	34	18	BPI: Silver
Handwritten	Released: July 24, 2012; Label: Mercury; Format: CD, LP, digital download	3	14	5	16	5	2	7	3	12	2	BPI: Silver
Get Hurt	Released: August 19, 2014; Label: Island; Format: CD, LP, digital download	4	11	9	26	3	3	13	19	14	4	
History Books	Released: October 27, 2023; Label: Rich Mahogany; Format: CD, LP, digital download	152	—	25	148	—	13	—	—	51	33	
"—" denotes albums that did not chart.

=== Compilation albums ===
List of compilation albums, with selected chart positions
Title	Album details	Peak chart positions					
Title	Album details	US	AUT	GER	SCO	SWI	UK
Singles Collection: 2008-2011	Released: June 18, 2013; Label: SideOneDummy; Format: 7" singles box set (limited to 2,500 copies)	—	—	—	—	—	—
The B-Sides	Released: January 28, 2014; Label: SideOneDummy; Format: CD	82	63	70	55	91	63
The '59 Sound Sessions	Released: June 15, 2018; Label: SideOneDummy; Format: CD, LP, digital download	— (Note: The '59 Sound Sessions did not enter the US Billboard 200, but peaked at number 44 on the US Top Album Sales Chart.)	—	17	—	—	—
"—" denotes albums that did not chart.

=== Live albums/DVD ===
List of live albums
Title	Album details
Live at Park Ave.	Released: April 19, 2009; Label: SideOneDummy; Format: LP
Live in London	Released: December 17, 2013; Label: Mercury; Format: DVD

== Extended plays ==
List of EPs, with selected chart positions
Title	Album details	Peak chart positions
Title	Album details	US
Señor and the Queen	Released: February 4, 2008; Label: Sabot Productions; Format: CD, LP	—
Sink or Swim Demos	Released: July 14, 2008; Label: Devildance; Format: LP	—
iTunes Session	Released: October 12, 2011; Label: SideOneDummy; Format: Digital download	144
Hold You Up	Released: November 23, 2012; Label: Mercury; Format: LP	—
Here Comes My Man	Released: November 28, 2012; Label: Mercury; Format: CD, digital download	
History Books - Short Stories	Released: March 22, 2024; Label: Rich Mahagany Recordings / Thirty Tigers; Format: Digital download	—

== Singles ==
List of singles, with selected chart positions, showing year released and album name
Title	Year	Peak chart positions										Album
Title	Year	US Sales	US Rock	CAN Rock	CZ Rock	FIN	MEX Air.	NLD	SCO	UK	UK Rock	Album
"The '59 Sound" (Note: "The '59 Sound" was initially released exclusively on vinyl and re-released in 2009.)	2008	—	— (Note: "The '59 Sound" did not enter the Hot Rock & Alternative Songs chart, but peaked at number 35 on the Alternative Airplay chart.)	26	—	—	25	—	64	115	—	The '59 Sound
"Old White Lincoln"	2008	—	—	—	—	—	—	—	—	— (Note: "Old White Lincoln" did not enter the UK Singles Chart, but peaked at number 44 on the UK Physical Singles Chart Top 100.)	—	The '59 Sound
"Great Expectations"	2009	—	—	—	—	—	25	—	—	— (Note: "Great Expectations" did not enter the UK Singles Chart, but peaked at number 32 on the UK Physical Singles Chart Top 100.)	—	The '59 Sound
"The Backseat" (Note: "The Backseat" was released as a digital single.)	2009	—	—	—	—	—	—	—	—	—	—	The '59 Sound
"American Slang"	2010	—	—	44	—	20	27	—	—	—	—	American Slang
"Bring It On"	2010	—	—	—	—	—	—	—	—	—	—	American Slang
"The Spirit of Jazz"	2010	—	—	—	—	—	—	—	—	—	—	American Slang
"The Diamond Church Street Choir"	2010	—	—	—	—	—	—	—	—	—	—	American Slang
"Boxer"	2010	—	—	—	—	—	31	—	—	—	—	American Slang
"Songs for Teenagers"	2010	—	—	—	—	—	—	—	—	— (Note: "Songs for Teenagers" did not enter the UK Singles Chart, but peaked at number 82 on the UK Physical Singles Chart Top 100.)	—	Non-album singles
"Tumbling Dice"	2010	8	—	—	—	—	—	—	—	— (Note: "Tumbling Dice" did not enter the UK Singles Chart, but peaked at number 51 on the UK Physical Singles Chart Top 100.)	—	Non-album singles
"State of Love and Trust (live)"	2011	—	—	—	—	—	—	—	—	—	—	The B-Sides
"45"	2012	8	15	20	18	—	—	91	57	75	1	Handwritten
"Here Comes My Man"	2012	—	—	—	—	—	—	—	—	—	7	Handwritten
"Hold You Up"	2012	6	—	—	—	—	—	—	—	—	—	Hold You Up (EP)
"Rollin' and Tumblin"	2014	—	—	—	—	—	—	—	—	—	6	Get Hurt
"Get Hurt"	2014	—	43	—	—	—	—	—	—	—	30	Get Hurt
"Stay Vicious"	2014	—	— (Note: "Stay Vicious" did not enter the Rock Songs chart, but peaked at number 24 on the Rock Digital Songs chart.)	—	—	—	—	—	—	—	—	Get Hurt
"Positive Charge"	2023	—	— (Note: "Positive Charge" did not enter the Hot Rock & Alternative Songs chart, but peaked at number 38 on the Alternative Airplay chart.)	—	—	—	—	—	—	—	—	History Books
"History Books (ft. Bruce Springsteen)"	2023	—	—	—	—	—	—	—	—	—	—	History Books
"Little Fires"	2023	—	—	—	—	—	—	—	—	—	—	History Books
"Autumn"	2023	—	—	—	—	—	—	—	—	—	—	History Books
"Spider Bites"	2023	—	—	—	—	—	—	—	—	—	—	History Books
"—" denotes singles that did not chart.

== Other charted songs / singles ==
List of other charted songs, with selected chart positions, showing year released and album name
Title	Year	Peak chart positions			Album
Title	Year	CZ Rock	UK Indie	UK Rock	Album
"We Came to Dance"	2007	—	— (Note: "We Came to Dance" did not enter the UK Independent Singles chart, but peaked at number 15 on the Independent Singles Breakers Top 20 chart.)	—	Sink or Swim
"Stay Lucky"	2010	5	—	—	American Slang
"She Loves You"	2010	—	47	—	American Slang
"Handwritten"	2012	—	—	18	Handwritten
"1,000 Years"	2014	—	—	—	Get Hurt
"—" denotes song that did not chart.

== Other appearances ==
Year	Song	Album
2006	"Drive" [demo version]	Go-Kart Vs. The Corporate Giant, Vol.4
2007	"I'da Called You Woody, Joe"	Generic Insight Radio, Vol. 1
2008	"Wooderson"	Warped Tour 2008 Tour Compilation, Disc 1
2008	"God's Gonna Cut You Down"	All Aboard: A Tribute to Johnny Cash
2008	"The '59 Sound"	Kerrang! The Album 2008
2009	"Old White Lincoln" [Live at Asbury Park, NJ]	Nr. 0609 Musikexpress
2009	"Great Expectations" [Live at Webster Hall, NYC]	Sound Check 124
2012	"Changing of the Guards"	Chimes of Freedom: Songs of Bob Dylan Honoring 50 Years of Amnesty International
2013	"Misery"	NCIS: Los Angeles (The Original TV Soundtrack)
2013	"Capo 4th Fret"	The Songs of Tony Sly: A Tribute

== Music videos ==
List of music videos, showing year released and director
Title	Year	Director(s)
"I'da Called You Woody, Joe"	2007	Kevin Slack
"The '59 Sound"	2008	—N/a
"Old White Lincoln"	2008	Kevin Slack
"The '59 Sound (Performance Only Version)"	2009	—N/a
"Great Expecations"	2009	Kevin Custer
"American Slang"	2010	Kevin Custer
"Bring It On"	2011	Kevin Slack
"45"	2012	—N/a
"Here Comes My Man"	2012	—N/a
"Rollin' and Tumblin'"	2014	—N/a
"Get Hurt"	2014	—N/a
"Positive Charge"	2023	Juliet Bryant
"History Books (ft. Bruce Springsteen)"	2023	Kelsey Hunter Ayres
"Little Fires"	2023	Kelsey Hunter Ayres
"Autumn"	2023	Dan King
"Spider Bites"	2023	Kelsey Hunter Ayres
