= Live in London (The Gaslight Anthem video) =

Video by The Gaslight Anthem
- Released: December 17, 2013
- Recorded: March 29–30, 2013
- Venue: Troxy, London, England
- Genre: Folk punk, punk rock, indie rock
- Length: 60:00
- Label: Mercury Records

Live in London is the first live DVD by American rock band The Gaslight Anthem which was released on December 17, 2013 through Mercury Records. Most of the DVD's ten songs are from the band's 2012 album, Handwritten and were recorded during two shows at the Troxy in London on March 29 and 30, 2013. The cover forms a homage to the album art of The Clash's London Calling.

== Track listing ==
1. "American Slang"
2. "The '59 Sound"
3. "Handwritten"
4. "45"
5. "Here Comes My Man"
6. "Too Much Blood"
7. "Great Expectations"
8. "Keepsake"
9. "She Loves You"
10. "Mulholland Drive"

== Personnel ==
Band

- Brian Fallon – lead vocals, guitar
- Alex Rosamilia – guitar, backing vocals,
- Alex Levine – bass guitar, backing vocals
- Benny Horowitz – drums
- Ian Perkins – guitar, backing vocals
