= Singles Collection: 2008–2011 =

Box set by the Gaslight Anthem
- Released: June 18, 2013
- Recorded: 2008–2011
- Genres: Heartland rock, punk rock, indie rock
- Label: SideOneDummy

The Gaslight Anthem chronology
Handwritten (2012)	Singles Collection: 2008–2011 (2013)	The B-Sides (2014)

Singles Collection: 2008–2011 is a box set by American rock band the Gaslight Anthem which was released on June 18, 2013. The box set contains nine black vinyl 7" singles packaged in a wooden box and feature the band's singles from 2008 to 2011 along with live recordings, acoustic sessions and B-sides. The box set was limited to only 2,500 copies.

== Track listing ==
All songs written and composed by Brian Fallon, Alex Rosamilia, Alex Levine, and Benny Horowitz, except where noted

No.	Title	Length
1.	"The '59 Sound"
2.	"State of Love and Trust" (Eddie Vedder, Mike McCready, Jeff Ament; originally performed by Pearl Jam)

No.	Title	Length
1.	"Old White Lincoln"
2.	"The '59 Sound (Acoustic on KEXP)"

No.	Title	Length
1.	"Great Expectations"
2.	"Great Expectations (Acoustic on KEXP)"

No.	Title	Length
1.	"American Slang"
2.	"American Slang (Acoustic)"

No.	Title	Length
1.	"Boxer"
2.	"Boxer (Acoustic)"

No.	Title	Length
1.	"The Diamond Church Street Choir"
2.	"Antonia Jane (Acoustic on KEXP)" (Amber Webber, Joshua Wells; originally performed by Lightning Dust)

No.	Title	Length
1.	"Stay Lucky"
2.	"Tumbling Dice" (Mick Jagger, Keith Richards; originally performed by The Rolling Stones)

No.	Title	Length
1.	"The Spirit of Jazz"
2.	"The Queen of Lower Chelsea (Acoustic)"

No.	Title	Length
1.	"Once Upon a Time" (Robert Bradley; originally performed by Robert Bradley's Blackwater Surprise)
2.	"She Loves You"

== Personnel ==
Band

- Brian Fallon – lead vocals, guitar
- Alex Rosamilia – guitar, backing vocals,
- Alex Levine – bass guitar, backing vocals
- Benny Horowitz – drums
