= The B-Sides (The Gaslight Anthem album) =

Compilation album by the Gaslight Anthem
- Released: January 28, 2014
- Recorded: 2008–2011
- Genre: Heartland rock
- Label: SideOneDummy

The Gaslight Anthem chronology
Singles Collection: 2008–2011 (2013)	The B-Sides (2014)	Get Hurt (2014)

Singles from The B-Sides
- 1. "State of Love and Trust (live)" Released: 2011

Professional ratings
Review scores
Source	Rating
AllMusic	3.5/5 stars

The B-Sides is a compilation album by American rock band the Gaslight Anthem, released on January 28, 2014, on SideOneDummy Records. The album compiles various b-sides and outtakes, many in acoustic form, from the band's singles from 2008 and 2011.

== Track listing ==
All tracks are written by Brian Fallon, Alex Rosamilia, Alex Levine, and Benny Horowitz, except where noted.

No.	Title	Length
1.	"She Loves You"
2.	"The '59 Sound (acoustic)"
3.	"State of Love and Trust (live)" (Eddie Vedder, Mike McCready, Jeff Ament; originally performed by Pearl Jam)
4.	"Tumbling Dice" (Mick Jagger, Keith Richards; originally performed by the Rolling Stones)
5.	"The Queen of Lower Chelsea (acoustic)"
6.	"Songs for Teenagers" (originally written and performed by Fake Problems)
7.	"Great Expectations (acoustic)"
8.	"Antonia Jane (acoustic)" (Amber Webber, Joshua Wells; originally performed by Lightning Dust)
9.	"American Slang (acoustic)"
10.	"Boxer (acoustic)"
11.	"Once Upon a Time" (Robert Bradley; originally performed by Robert Bradley's Blackwater Surprise)

== Personnel ==
Band

- Brian Fallon—lead vocals, guitar
- Alex Rosamilia—guitar, backing vocals
- Alex Levine—bass guitar, backing vocals
- Benny Horowitz—drums

=== Chart performance ===
Chart (2014)	Peak position
US Billboard 200	82
