= Hold You Up =

EP by The Gaslight Anthem
- Released: November 23, 2012
- Recorded: July 2011
- Label: Mercury
- Producer: Brian Fallon

The Gaslight Anthem chronology
| Handwritten (2012) | Hold You Up (2012) |

Hold You Up is a vinyl only EP by The Gaslight Anthem released on 10" red vinyl. It was released on November 23, 2012 for Black Friday Record Store Day (limited to 3000 copies). The EP features two original acoustic performances and one cover song.

== Composition ==
Hold You Up includes a cover of Skinny Love by Bon Iver

== Track list ==
| No. | Title | Writer(s) | Length |
|---|---|---|---|
| 1. | "Hold You Up" | The Gaslight Anthem |
| 2. | "Misery" | The Gaslight Anthem |
| 3. | "Skinny Love" | Justin Vernon |
