= History Books =

Studio album by the Gaslight Anthem
- Released: October 27, 2023
- Recorded: December 2022 – May 2023
- Studios: Tarquin Studios, Bridgeport, Connecticut; Windmill Lane, Dublin, Ireland; Studio G, Brooklyn, New York ^{[c]}
- Genres: Heartland rock, indie rock
- Length: 40:23
- Labels: Rich Mahogany; Thirty Tigers
- Producer: Peter Katis

The Gaslight Anthem chronology
Get Hurt (2014)	History Books (2023)

Singles from History Books
- 1. "Positive Charge" Released: April 28, 2023; 2. "History Books" Released: July 21, 2023; 3. "Little Fires" Released: September 5, 2023; 4. "Autumn" Released: October 3, 2023; 5. "Spider Bites" Released: October 26, 2023

History Books is the sixth studio album by American rock band the Gaslight Anthem, released on October 27, 2023, through Rich Mahogany Records and Thirty Tigers. Produced by Peter Katis, it is the band's first studio album in nine years, following their reunion in March 2022 and subsequent world tour throughout the year.

== Background and production ==
Following the conclusion of the touring cycle for their previous album, Get Hurt, at Reading Festival on August 30, 2015, the Gaslight Anthem entered an indefinite hiatus, aside from a short tour in 2018 celebrating the 10th anniversary of their 2008 album The '59 Sound, with the band members pursuing new projects and solo careers.

Over time, the band's lead singer, songwriter, and guitarist Brian Fallon began to soften on the idea of reviving the band, with the initial decision to do so tracing back to shortly after recording concluded for his 2020 solo album Local Honey. The COVID-19 pandemic further influenced his decision to revive the band: "I think time, and getting locked down, and not being able to go out ... and then you see different things happen, like Foo Fighters losing Taylor Hawkins, you consider, 'All of this is temporary, and you've got to enjoy it while you can.'"

This culminated in a 2021 meeting with Bruce Springsteen in which Fallon openly discussed his desire to reunite the band, but also his trepidation about doing so. Springsteen encouraged him, suggesting that he should write a duet for the two of them to sing on a prospective project with the band. Fallon challenged himself to write four songs, reasoning that he would contact his bandmates if they were of "equal quality to something that the Gaslight Anthem has done". After presenting the songs and discussing the possibility of a reunion with his bandmates, he was met with "the energy I knew we needed to make it happen".

On March 25, 2022, after an almost seven-year-long hiatus, the Gaslight Anthem confirmed their reunion. In a statement shared across the band's social media channels, Fallon announced that the band would tour that year and also confirmed that the band was "returning to full time status" and working on a new studio album. Following the tour's conclusion, the band entered the studio with Peter Katis to record their as-yet-untitled sixth studio album. The band continued recording throughout January 2023, with Fallon indicating the same month that mixing would be commencing from February. Springsteen's vocal feature on the title track was recorded in Dublin while on tour in May.

== Themes and composition ==
Fallon's experiences with therapy and medication influenced the album's direction and themes. He highlighted "Positive Charge", the first song he wrote for the record, as "a message of joy to ourselves and to our audience" about "looking at the things you've come through and feeling like you want to go ahead with an open heart toward the future, believing that the best years are not behind any of us and the good we have is worth something."

He referred to the album overall as the "next phase of the band" and stated that it was about "recognizing what you have". Fallon further outlined the thematic through-line of the album, calling the title track "the other side of the coin" from "Positive Charge". "There were all these people in my life where I had been such a sucker for not putting up boundaries," Fallon elaborated. "I had to be pretty honest about how I felt about both sides, I feel like you can't write a positive song like Positive Charge unless you've really been through it ... I didn't just want it to be positive throughout the whole record, because that's not how you feel."

Of the album's Bruce Springsteen feature, Fallon said, "There's a definitely a little wink in there," alluding to the longstanding comparisons made between the band's sound and Springsteen's. "It's like 'Now write this off,' we've got the approval of the guy! What are you going to say? You can't say anything!"

== Release and promotion ==
Following the reunion announcement, on March 28 the band announced a world tour, with dates across Europe, the United Kingdom, and the United States. The tour began at the Columbiahalle in Berlin, Germany, on August 9, 2022, and concluded on October 8, 2022, at the PNC Bank Arts Center in Holmdel, New Jersey, with another round of tour dates across North America throughout May 2023 announced in February 2023.

On April 28, 2023, the band released "Positive Charge", their first new music in nine years, accompanied by the addition of more tour dates to their North American tour between September and October 2023. The song received its live debut three days later on May 1, 2023, at the House of Blues in Houston, Texas and was played at every subsequent show on the tour. On July 21, 2023, the band announced that their new album History Books would be released on October 27, 2023, and released a second single from the record, the title track, featuring a guest vocal appearance from Bruce Springsteen. The album's third single, "Little Fires", followed on September 5, 2023.

The band premiered "Michigan, 1975" at a show in Michigan on September 16, playing the studio version over the PA system in lieu of a traditional encore break, with Fallon stating that fans were free to share any recordings of it after the fact. On September 19, the band announced two homecoming shows celebrating the release of History Books at the White Eagle Hall in New Jersey on October 27 and 28. An additional two dates were added on September 20, scheduled for 29 and 30, with all four shows selling out by September 22. The record's fourth single, "Autumn" was released on October 3, accompanied by the announcement of EU/UK tour dates throughout 2024, including a headline slot at 2000 Trees Festival. On March 18, 2024, the band announced a new round of tour dates across the US, taking place between July and September 2024.

History Books was released on October 27, 2023, accompanied by the music video for the record's opening track and the album's fifth single, "Spider Bites." Following an Instagram post teasing "some extra stuff" on February 10, 2024, the band released a four track companion EP titled History Books - Short Stories on March 22, 2024. Produced by Butch Walker, the EP features acoustic versions of both the title track and lead single "Positive Charge", a re-recorded version of "Blue Jeans & White T-shirts" (originally from their 2008 EP Señor and the Queen) featuring Emily Wolfe, and a cover of Billie Eilish's 2016 track "Ocean Eyes" featuring Karina Rykman, which received its live debut at the Manchester Apollo on the same day as its release.

On July 12, 2024, the band released an "Expanded Edition" of History Books, featuring a new mix of the main tracklist by Chris Dugan, as well as the four tracks included on the Short Stories EP, and a new version of "Little Fires" featuring guest vocals from Alicia Bognanno of Bully.

The band gave their reasoning for the new mix on social media, stating that while they were initially enthused about "how incredible [the original mix] sounded on the vinyl test presses", they felt that the mix on digital and streaming releases "didn't quite hit the mark." The Expanded Edition was made available on streaming, with a free download for those who had purchased MP3 and CD copies of History Books.

== Reception ==
Professional ratings
Aggregate scores
Source	Rating
Metacritic	76/100
Review scores
Source	Rating
Clash	8/10
Classic Rock	4/5 stars
Distorted Sound	9/10
DIY	4/5 stars
Glide Magazine	80/100
Mojo	3/5 stars
Paste	7.5/10
PopMatters	7/10
Sputnikmusic	3.8/5
Uncut	4/5 stars
Under the Radar	8/10
XS Noize	5/5 stars

Upon release, History Books received generally positive reviews from critics, with Metacritic assigning the album an aggregated score of 76 out of 100 based on 11 critic reviews, of which 10 were positive.

Praise for the album was largely directed towards its thematic and emotive qualities, the performances of the band members, and the perceived maturation of the band's sound and Fallon's lyricism. Craig Howieson of Clash scored the record 8 out of 10, highlighting "a renewed nuance" in Fallon's songwriting. He also praised the album's "big guitars, anthemic singalongs and bruised and bloodied ballads", and the band's ability to "capture a feeling that's almost impossible to describe." Ryan Dillon of Glide Magazine concurred, describing the album as a "layered outing ... that is as familiar as it is refreshing." Ed Walton of Distorted Sound was similarly enthusiastic, awarding the album a 9 out of 10 and concluding that the album was "a welcome return, full of heart, soul, emotion and maturity," while Jesse Yarbrough of XS Noize was even more complimentary in his 5 star review, calling it a "fantastic album" with "a great mix of singalong anthems and quieter, more thoughtful tracks."

Sputnikmusic gave History Books a 3.8 out 5, criticizing album opener "Spider Bites" as a "clunky song" with "bland verse structure" and a "repetitive chorus", a criticism echoed by Brian Stout in his 7 out of 10 review for PopMatters, stating that the song could "only muster up one memorable line." In spite of their initial criticisms however, Sputnikmusic ultimately concluded that "this isn't an album to convert the naysayers, but for the already initiated, prepare yourself to once more sing with your heroes, 33 rounds per minute", a sentiment once again shared by Stout: "Longtime fans will probably find plenty to like, even love, about History Books. The Gaslight Anthem are in fine form; Fallon's still a charismatic singer, and he still shows flashes of brilliance in his lyrics."

Paste's Eric R. Danton was also more reserved in his review, stating it was "less frenetic and more reflective" than their previous works, but ultimately praising it as "the work of a band that has arguably outgrown the fiery intensity of youth without losing the passion that made [the band] so compelling in the first place." James McNair of Mojo compared the record's sound to that of a "gnarlier early R.E.M., The Hold Steady, and, yes, Springsteen", and, while he felt that some of the songs "occasionally [suffered] from over-telegraphed choruses", praised the album's lyricism, highlighting Fallon's "fervour and gift for an apposite metaphor."

== Track listing ==
All tracks are written by Brian Fallon, Alex Rosamilia, Alex Levine, and Benny Horowitz, except where noted.

History Books track listing
No.	Title	Length
1.	"Spider Bites"	4:19
2.	"History Books" (featuring Bruce Springsteen)	3:53
3.	"Autumn"	4:01
4.	"Positive Charge"	4:06
5.	"Michigan, 1975"	4:15
6.	"Little Fires"	3:25
7.	"The Weatherman"	4:27
8.	"Empires"	4:23
9.	"I Live in the Room Above Her"	4:17
10.	"A Lifetime of Preludes"	3:18
Total length:		40:23

Expanded Edition
No.	Title	Writer(s)	Producer(s)	Length
11.	"Little Fires (featuring Alicia Bognanno)"			3:21
12.	"Ocean Eyes (featuring Karina Rykman, originally performed by Billie Eilish)"	Finneas O'Connell	Butch Walker	3:03
13.	"Blue Jeans & White T-Shirts (featuring Emily Wolfe)"		Butch Walker	3:37
14.	"Positive Charge - Acoustic"		Butch Walker	4:14
15.	"History Books - Acoustic"		Butch Walker	4:05
Total length:				58:38

History Books - Short Stories EP
No.	Title	Writer(s)	Producer(s)	Length
1.	"Ocean Eyes (featuring Karina Rykman, originally performed by Billie Eilish)"	Finneas O'Connell	Butch Walker	3:03
2.	"Blue Jeans & White T-Shirts (featuring Emily Wolfe)"		Butch Walker	3:37
3.	"Positive Charge - Acoustic"		Butch Walker	4:14
4.	"History Books - Acoustic"		Butch Walker	4:05
Total length:				15:01

== Personnel ==
Credits adapted from History Books, liner notes History Books - Short Stories EP liner notes, and Expanded Edition Bandcamp page

The Gaslight Anthem

- Brian Fallon – lead vocals, guitar
- Alex Rosamilia – guitar
- Benny Horowitz – drums, percussion
- Alex Levine – bass guitar

Additional musicians

- Ian Perkins – guitar
- Bryan Haring – piano
- Kori Gardner – vocals
- Bruce Springsteen – vocals
- Stefan Babcock – vocals
- Thomas Bartlett – keyboards
- Peter Katis – keyboards

Production

- Peter Katis – production, engineering, mixing ^{[a]}
- Greg Giorgio – engineering
- Kurt Leon – engineering
- Rob Lebret – vocal engineering
- Joel Hamilton – engineering^{[c]}
- Greb Calbi – mastering ^{[a]}
- Chris Dugan – mixing ^{[b]}^{[c]}
- Whynot Jansveld – mastering ^{[b]}^{[c]}
- Butch Walker – production ^{[c]}

Additional personnel

- Kelsey Hunter Ayres – art direction, photography
- Rich Johannes Weinberger – layout, design
- Casey McAllister – additional photography

== Charts ==
Chart performance for History Books
Chart (2023)	Peak position
Austrian Albums (Ö3 Austria)	25
Belgian Albums (Ultratop Flanders)	148
German Albums (Offizielle Top 100)	13
Scottish Albums (Official Charts)	11
Swiss Albums (Schweizer Hitparade)	51
UK Albums (Official Charts)	33
UK Independent Albums (Official Charts)	8
US Billboard 200	152

== Notes ==
^a Standard edition
^b Expanded Edition
^c Short Stories EP
