= Live at Park Ave. =

Live album by the Gaslight Anthem
- Released: April 19, 2009
- Recorded: Think Indie store, Park Ave CDs, Orlando, Florida
- Genres: Punk rock, folk punk
- Length: 20:58
- Label: SideOneDummy

The Gaslight Anthem chronology
The '59 Sound (2008)	Live at Park Ave. (2009)	American Slang (2010)

Live at Park Ave. is a live album by the Gaslight Anthem. It was recorded on October 22, 2008, and released exclusively on vinyl on April 19, 2009.
This live EP consists of 6 songs, recorded live at the Think Indie store, Park Ave CDs, in Orlando, Florida, during the band's tour with Rise Against, Thrice and Alkaline Trio. The last song played, "Once Upon a Time", is a cover of Robert Bradley's Blackwater Surprise, previously released as an iTunes bonus track on the band's successful album The '59 Sound.

== Track listing ==
All tracks are written by Brian Fallon, Alex Rosamilia, Alex Levine, and Benny Horowitz, except where noted.

No.	Title	Length
1.	"Film Noir"	3:20
2.	"Miles Davis & The Cool"	4:16
3.	"Blue Jeans & White T-Shirts"	3:20
4.	"The Navesink Banks"	2:48
5.	"Here's Looking at You, Kid"	3:34
6.	"Once Upon a Time" (Robert Bradley; originally performed by Robert Bradley's Blackwater Surprise)	3:40
Total length:		20:58
