= Get Hurt (album) =

2014 studio album by the Gaslight Anthem

Studio album by the Gaslight Anthem
- Released: August 8, 2014
- Recorded: March 10 – April 18, 2014
- Studios: Blackbird Studios (Nashville, Tennessee)
- Genres: Alternative rock, heartland rock
- Length: 41:15
- Label: Island
- Producer: Mike Crossey

The Gaslight Anthem chronology
The B-Sides (2014)	Get Hurt (2014)	History Books (2023)

Singles from Get Hurt
- 1. "Rollin' and Tumblin'" Released: July 1, 2014; 2. "Get Hurt" Released: July 8, 2014; 3. "Stay Vicious" Released: July 28, 2014; 4. "1,000 Years (Europe)" Released: 2014

Get Hurt is the fifth studio album by American rock band the Gaslight Anthem. It was released on August 8, 2014, by Island Records. It marks their first album on Island Records, which absorbed the band and its previous label, Mercury Records.

Produced by Mike Crossey and inspired by vocalist and guitarist Brian Fallon's divorce from his wife of ten years, the band was influenced by artists whose albums represented "career shifts".

== Writing ==
The band announced on July 4, 2013, via their Tumblr site, that they were "working on new songs for a new Gaslight Anthem album in 2014".

Fallon cited Pearl Jam's No Code album as an influence and inspiration for the album.

In an interview with Rolling Stone published May 23, 2014, Fallon described the album as "completely different than anything we had ever done before. Instead of going that extra step of just adding some organ or some background vocals, this time we actually really changed up a lot of the sounds."

A post on the band's official website advised fans to "Get ready for some things you've never heard this band do!"

"That record is always going to puzzle me," Fallon reflected in 2018. "It was such a confusing time in general. We tried to do something specific and then didn't go all the way with it. We sort of pulled back. I'm not embarrassed by it, but I wouldn't make it again."

== Recording ==
On March 10, 2014, the band entered Blackbird Studios in Nashville, Tennessee, to record their fifth studio album. The band stated on April 14 that they had arrived at the "last week in the studio" of recording the album.

== Release and promotion ==
On June 16, 2014, the band announced the title of the album and released a teaser video with a snippet of a new song (later revealed to be the album's opener "Stay Vicious"). On August 5, the entire album was made available to stream via iTunes Radio. Get Hurt was released in the United Kingdom on August 11, 2014, by Virgin EMI Records, and in the United States on August 12, 2014, by Island Records. The album was originally scheduled to be released one week later than its eventual release date.

The band performed "Get Hurt" on Late Show with David Letterman on August 18. In support of the album, the band toured North America and Europe during the summer and fall of 2014. Dates included Jimmy Eat World, Against Me!, Bayside, and Deer Tick, as well as festival stops at Austin City Limits Music Festival and the Ottawa Folk Festival.

=== Singles ===
The lead single from the album, "Rollin' and Tumblin'", was released on July 1, 2014. The second single, "Get Hurt", was released on July 8, 2014. The third and final single, "Stay Vicious", was released on July 28, 2014.

== Critical reception ==
Professional ratings
Aggregate scores
Source	Rating
Metacritic	62/100
Review scores
Source	Rating
AbsolutePunk	8.5/10
AllMusic	4/5 stars
Clash	7/10
DIY	3/5 stars
The Guardian	2/5 stars
Pitchfork	3.0/10
PopMatters	6/10
Slant Magazine	1.5/5 stars
Sputnikmusic	3.3/5

Get Hurt received mixed reviews from music critics. Metacritic, which assigns a weighted average of ratings from mainstream critics, gave it a score of a 62, based on 29 reviews, indicating "generally favorable reviews".

In Absolute Punk, Craig Manning wrote, "It's disheartening that the album isn't the game-changing record Fallon promised, and it's too bad that it doesn't have the thesis-statement cohesion of albums like The 59 Sound and American Slang. But the songs are still great, the production is still excellent, and the performances of the band members have rarely been in finer form." Clash magazine's Mischa Pearlman rated the album seven out of ten, calling it "rock 'n' roll of the purest kind." Tim Jonze of The Guardian gave the album two stars out of five, saying "Get Hurt is nothing but the same old overblown rock sound with every dial turned up several digits past 11." Gregory Heaney of AllMusic rated the album four stars out of five, writing, "Get Hurt shows that so long as they're passionate about their music, it doesn't matter where the band are getting their inspiration from, because genuinely caring about something is always compelling."

== Commercial performance ==
Get Hurt debuted at number four on the Billboard 200, selling 33,000 copies in its first week. The album also debuted at number one on the Alternative Albums and Tastemaker Albums charts, at number two on the Top Rock Albums chart, and at number four on the Digital Albums chart.

== Track listing ==
All tracks are written by Brian Fallon, Alex Rosamilia, Alex Levine, and Benny Horowitz, unless otherwise noted

No.	Title	Length
1.	"Stay Vicious"	3:33
2.	"1,000 Years"	3:38
3.	"Get Hurt"	3:43
4.	"Stray Paper"	2:48
5.	"Helter Skeleton"	3:13
6.	"Underneath the Ground"	4:05
7.	"Rollin' and Tumblin'"	2:50
8.	"Red Violins"	3:20
9.	"Selected Poems"	2:53
10.	"Ain't That a Shame"	3:02
11.	"Break Your Heart"	4:20
12.	"Dark Places"	3:44
Total length:		41:15

Deluxe edition bonus tracks
No.	Title	Length
13.	"Sweet Morphine"	4:17
14.	"Mama's Boys"	4:01
15.	"Halloween"	3:11
Total length:		52:44

Spotify deluxe edition bonus track
No.	Title	Writer(s)	Length
16.	"Anywhere I Lay My Head (Tom Waits cover)"	Tom Waits	2:13
Total length:			55:01

iTunes Store deluxe edition bonus track
No.	Title	Length
16.	"Have Mercy"	3:21
Total length:		56:05

Best Buy deluxe edition bonus track
No.	Title	Writer(s)	Length
16.	"This Is Where We Part (Twopointeight cover)"	Fredrick Björk, José Dominguez Lopez, Thomas Åberg, and Fredrik Georg Eriksson	3:54
Total length:			56:33

== Personnel ==
Credits adapted from AllMusic:

The Gaslight Anthem

- Brian Fallon – guitar, vocals, lead vocals
- Alex Rosamilia – guitar, keyboards, vocals
- Benny Horowitz – drums, percussion, vocals
- Alex Levine – bass, vocals

Additional musicians

- Sharon Jones – vocals (background)
- Ian Perkins – guitar, vocals
- Natalie Prass – vocals (background)

Production

- Mike Crossey – producer, mixing
- Mike Spink – engineer
- Jonathan Gilmore – assistant engineer
- Robin Schmidt – mastering
- John Van Hamersveld – design, photography

== Charts ==
Chart (2014)	Peak position
Australian Albums (ARIA)	11
Austrian Albums (Ö3 Austria)	9
Belgian Albums (Ultratop Flanders)	26
Belgian Albums (Ultratop Wallonia)	136
Canadian Albums (Billboard)	3
Dutch Albums (Album Top 100)	19
Finnish Albums (Suomen virallinen lista)	37
German Albums (Offizielle Top 100)	3
Irish Albums (IRMA)	13
New Zealand Albums (RMNZ)	36
Scottish Albums (Official Charts)	3
Swiss Albums (Schweizer Hitparade)	14
UK Albums (Official Charts)	4
UK Rock & Metal Albums (Official Charts)	1
US Billboard 200	4
US Top Alternative Albums (Billboard)	1
US Top Rock Albums (Billboard)	2

== Release history ==
Region	Date	Format(s)	Label
Australia	August 8, 2014	CD; LP; digital download	Island
United States	August 12, 2014	CD; LP; digital download	Island
United Kingdom	August 11, 2014	CD; LP; digital download	Virgin EMI
