= 45 (The Gaslight Anthem song) =

2012 song from the Gaslight Anthem

Single by the Gaslight Anthem

from the album Handwritten
- Released: May 8, 2012
- Recorded: 2012
- Genre: Punk rock
- Length: 3:21
- Label: Mercury
- Songwriter: Brian Fallon
- Producer: Brendan O'Brien

The Gaslight Anthem singles chronology
"The Spirit of Jazz" (2010)	"45" (2012)	"Here Comes My Man" (2012)

"45" is a song by American rock band the Gaslight Anthem, released on May 8, 2012 as the lead single from their fourth studio album, Handwritten (2012).

== Composition ==
"45" was the first song written for Handwritten. Lead singer, Brian Fallon said of the song, "This record was different, because when we started out, I didn't know what was gonna happen, you know, and after American Slang after The '59 Sound, I was like, 'What am I gonna do? Is there anymore Gaslight songs?' It's a scary thing when that feeling, it hits you. When we wrote the song '45', I was like, 'Thank God.' I just knew that it was gonna be alright."

== Music video ==
The music video features the band playing the song for a live audience at the New Jersey music venue, The Stone Pony.

== In other media ==
"45" is part of the soundtrack to the video game NHL 13, as a playable track in Guitar Hero Live, and as a downloadable song in Rocksmith 2014.

== Track listing ==
7" single
No.	Title	Writer(s)	Length
1.	"45"	Brian Fallon, Alex Rosamilia, Alex Levine, Benny Horowitz	3:21
2.	"You Got Lucky" (originally performed by Tom Petty and the Heartbreakers)	Tom Petty, Mike Campbell	3:47
Total length:			7:08

== Charts ==
=== Weekly charts ===
Weekly chart performance for "45"
Chart (2012)	Peak position
Canada Rock (Billboard)	20
Czech Republic Modern Rock (IFPI)	18
Netherlands (Single Top 100)	91
Scottish Singles Sales (Official Charts)	57
UK Singles (Official Charts)	75
UK Rock & Metal (Official Charts)	1
US Hot Rock & Alternative Songs (Billboard)	15

=== Year-end charts ===
Year-end chart performance for "45"
Chart (2012)	Position
US Hot Rock Songs (Billboard)	51
