= Handwritten (The Gaslight Anthem album) =

2012 studio album by the Gaslight Anthem

Studio album by the Gaslight Anthem
- Released: July 24, 2012
- Recorded: January 23 – February 18, 2012, in Nashville, Tennessee, U.S.
- Genres: Punk rock; hard rock; heartland rock; hardcore punk
- Length: 40:50
- Label: Mercury
- Producer: Brendan O'Brien

The Gaslight Anthem chronology
| American Slang (2010) | Handwritten (2012) | Singles Collection: 2008–2011 (2013) |

Singles from Handwritten
- 1. "45" Released: June 2, 2012; 2. "Here Comes My Man" Released: October 24, 2012; 3. "Handwritten (Europe)" Released: 2012

Deluxe Edition Cover

Handwritten is the fourth studio album and major label debut by American rock band the Gaslight Anthem, released on July 24, 2012, through Mercury Records.Produced by Brendan O'Brien, the album was preceded by its lead single, "45", and features liner notes by Nick Hornby.

The album reached No. 2 in the United Kingdom, No. 3 in the United States and also charted in the top ten in Austria, Canada, Germany, Ireland and the Netherlands.

== Writing ==
As of July 2010, Brian Fallon said he was working on new material for a fourth album. Subsequently, Fallon stated on his blog that the band would start writing their record in January 2011. However, prior to playing at Pinkpop in June 2011, Fallon stated that they had just started working on the new album and that it would not be released for at least a few months. In the same interview, Fallon said the band's next record would sound closer to their breakthrough record, The '59 Sound, rather than American Slang. During this time, Fallon was also working with good friend Ian Perkins, putting the finishing touches on their side project the Horrible Crowes.

On October 6, 2011, the Gaslight Anthem announced via Facebook that they had officially signed with Mercury Records. They stated that they were sorry to leave their friends at SideOneDummy Records, but felt that the change was necessary for their musical career.

== Recording ==
On October 14, 2011, the Gaslight Anthem announced that their last show before going into the studio to record their new album would be on December 9 at the Asbury Park Convention Hall.

On January 12, 2012, the band announced via their Twitter feed that they would be recording the following week in Nashville. Recording took place at Blackbird Studios, Nashville. On February 17, 2012, they announced that recording of original songs for the album had been completed and they would soon be recording b-sides and covers. It was announced on February 22, 2012, via the band's Twitter feed that their fourth album would be titled Handwritten.

The band announced on their official Facebook page on April 26, 2012, that the album's lead single would be "45", and it would receive its worldwide premiere as Zane Lowe's Hottest Record in the World on BBC Radio 1 on April 30.

On April 30, 2012, the band announced that the album would be released July 23, 2012, in the UK and July 24 in the US.

== Critical reception ==
Professional ratings
Aggregate scores
| Source | Rating |
|---|---|
| Metacritic | 71/100 |
Review scores
| Source | Rating |
| AllMusic | 4/5 stars |
| Alternative Press | 4.5/5 stars |
| The A.V. Club | B+ |
| Entertainment Weekly | B+ |
| NME | 8/10 |
| Pitchfork | 5.7/10 |
| Punknews.org | 4.5/5 stars |
| Rolling Stone | 3.5/5 stars |
| Sputnikmusic | 4/5 |
| Uncut | 7/10 |

Handwritten received mostly positive reviews from music critics. At Metacritic, which assigns a "weighted average" rating out of 100 from selected independent ratings and reviews from mainstream critics, the album received a Metascore of 71/100, based on 31 reviews, indicating "generally favorable reviews".

== Commercial performance ==
Handwritten debuted at No. 3 on the US Billboard 200 chart, selling 40,000 copies in its first week of release. It remains the band's highest positioned album on the Billboard 200 chart and best sales week to date.

During the 2015–16 season, the New Jersey Devils began using "Howl" as the team's goal song. On February 17, 2024, the Devils played the Philadelphia Flyers at MetLife Stadium. Before the game, it was announced that The Gaslight Anthem would perform "Howl" live every time the Devils scored, in a game the Devils went on to win 6–3.

== Music videos ==
The Gaslight Anthem released a music video for their track "Here Comes My Man" featuring actress Elisha Cuthbert.

== Track listing ==
All tracks are written by Brian Fallon, Alex Rosamilia, Alex Levine, and Benny Horowitz, except where noted

| No. | Title | Length |
|---|---|---|
| 1. | ""45"" | 3:23 |
| 2. | "Handwritten" | 3:58 |
| 3. | "Here Comes My Man" | 3:35 |
| 4. | "Mulholland Drive" | 3:53 |
| 5. | "Keepsake" | 4:02 |
| 6. | "Too Much Blood" | 5:07 |
| 7. | "Howl" | 2:04 |
| 8. | "Biloxi Parish" | 3:46 |
| 9. | "Desire" | 3:15 |
| 10. | "Mae" | 4:07 |
| 11. | "National Anthem" | 3:40 |
| Total length: | | 40:50 |

Deluxe edition bonus tracks
| No. | Title | Length |
|---|---|---|
| 12. | "Blue Dahlia" | 4:28 |
| 13. | "Sliver" (Kurt Cobain, Krist Novoselic; originally performed by Nirvana) | 2:06 |
| 14. | "You Got Lucky" (Tom Petty, Mike Campbell; originally performed by Tom Petty and the Heartbreakers) | 3:47 |
| Total length: | | 51:11 |

Amazon.co.uk and US iTunes bonus track
| No. | Title | Length |
|---|---|---|
| 12. | "Teenage Rebellion" | 4:28 |

== Credits and personnel ==
The Gaslight Anthem

- Brian Fallon – lead vocals, guitar
- Alex Rosamilia – guitar, backing vocals
- Alex Levine – bass guitar, backing vocals
- Benny Horowitz – drums, percussion, backing vocals

Additional musicians

- Ian Perkins – guitar, backing vocals
- Brendan O'Brien – guitar, backing vocals, Hammond B-3 organ, piano, percussion
- Patrick Warren – string arrangement, keyboard on "National Anthem"

Production

- Brendan O'Brien – record producer, mixing engineer
- Nick DiDia – recording engineer
- Bob Ludwig – audio mastering
- Danny Clinch – photography
- El Jefe Design – art direction, design, layout

== Charts ==
=== Weekly charts ===
| Chart (2012) | Peak position |
|---|---|
| Australian Albums (ARIA) | 14 |
| Austrian Albums (Ö3 Austria) | 5 |
| Belgian Albums (Ultratop Flanders) | 16 |
| Belgian Albums (Ultratop Wallonia) | 103 |
| Canadian Albums (Billboard) | 5 |
| Croatian Albums (HDU) | 45 |
| Danish Albums (Hitlisten) | 37 |
| Dutch Albums (Album Top 100) | 3 |
| Finnish Albums (Suomen virallinen lista) | 45 |
| German Albums (Offizielle Top 100) | 2 |
| Irish Albums (IRMA) | 7 |
| Italian Albums (FIMI) | 82 |
| Norwegian Albums (VG-lista) | 18 |
| Scottish Albums (Official Charts) | 1 |
| Swedish Albums (Sverigetopplistan) | 25 |
| Swiss Albums (Schweizer Hitparade) | 12 |
| UK Albums (Official Charts) | 2 |
| UK Rock & Metal Albums (Official Charts) | 1 |
| US Billboard 200 | 3 |
| US Top Alternative Albums (Billboard) | 1 |
| US Top Rock Albums (Billboard) | 1 |

=== Year-end charts ===
| Chart (2012) | Position |
|---|---|
| UK Albums (OCC) | 189 |

== Certifications ==
| Region | Certification | Certified units/sales |
|---|---|---|
| United Kingdom (BPI) | Silver | 80,163 |

== Release history ==
| Country | Date | Label |
|---|---|---|
| Australia | July 20, 2012 | Universal Music |
| Germany | July 20, 2012 | Universal Music |
| France | July 23, 2012 | Universal Music |
| United Kingdom | July 23, 2012 | Mercury Records |
| United States | July 24, 2012 | Mercury Records |
| Italy | July 24, 2012 | Universal Music |
