= The '59 Sound (song) =

- 2008 single

Single by the Gaslight Anthem

from the album The '59 Sound
- Released: July 22, 2008; June 15, 2009 (UK re-release)
- Recorded: 2008
- Length: 3:11
- Label: SideOneDummy Records
- Songwriter(s): Brian Fallon, Alex Rosamilia, Alex Levine, Benny Horowitz
- Producer(s): Ted Hutt

The Gaslight Anthem singles chronology
"The '59 Sound" (2008)	"Old White Lincoln" (2008)

Audio sample
- "The '59 Sound": file; help

"The '59 Sound" is the debut single by American rock band the Gaslight Anthem. Written by the band and produced by Ted Hutt, it is the title track of the band's second full-length album. The song is an elegy to a friend who died in a car accident. The song reached the U.S. Alternative Airplay chart in early 2009, and was performed live by the band with Bruce Springsteen at the Glastonbury and Hard Rock Calling festivals in June 2009.

== Background ==
"The '59 Sound" was the first song written by singer-songwriter-guitarist Brian Fallon for the band's album The '59 Sound (2008). The song's title references a 1959 Fender Bassman amplifier that he built for himself. Fallon recalled, "I never wrote a song like that before. And I thought it was better than anything else I ever wrote. I showed it to the guys [in the band] and they thought it was awesome. Then the next one was 'Great Expectations' and we definitely knew where we were going with [the album]." Fallon said the band had tried to emulate the sound of soul music from the late 1950s because "back then it seemed like there was a genuine feeling of excitement going on that I don't think is necessarily happening right now. It seems like when you look back on that era a lot of it is embodied in that Memphis sound, so it's just a giant celebratory thing."

== Lyrics ==
The song's themes mix punk rock with classic rock. The song is an elegy for a friend who died in a car accident, while the band was elsewhere performing a gig. The singer, Brian Fallon, asks his deceased friend: "Did you hear the '59 Sound coming through on Grandmama's radio?", referring to late 1950s music that they listened to while growing up. He continues by asking about his friend's discomfort in the hospital, shortly before his death. The song ends with the sentences "Young boys, Young girls (Ain't supposed to die on a Saturday night)", emphasizing the unexpectancy of the friend's death. Fallon said the song is about growing older; and 'carrying on', accepting that loved ones eventually die.

== Release and reception ==
The single was released as a CD single in July 2008, and it reached American modern rock radio stations in September. Its music video, released by SideOneDummy Records, premiered the following month. In January 2009, the song entered the Billboard Alternative Airplay chart, peaked at number 35 in February, and spent 10 weeks on the chart. It reached a peak position of 26 on Billboard's Canada Rock Chart in April, and of 115 on the UK Singles Chart in July. That same month, "The '59 Sound" was re-released in the UK as a physical single, backed with a live cover version of Pearl Jam's "State of Love and Trust", as well as a live performance of "We Came to Dance", a song from the Gaslight Anthem's first album, Sink or Swim.

"The '59 Sound" was well received by music critics, with Pitchfork Media writer Tom Breihan praising the bridge: "It's simple, it's sincere, and it kills me every time." CMJ New Music writer Tyler Theofilos praised the song's raw, energetic soundscape. Jason MacNeil of PopMatters compared it to the Killers and Tim-era Replacements. The Spin magazine described "The '59 Sound" as "nuanced and assured". The song was ranked number 62 on Rolling Stone's list of "The 100 Best Singles of 2008".

== Live ==
The Gaslight Anthem performed "The '59 Sound" live on the talk shows Late Night with Conan O'Brien and Late Show with David Letterman. The band was joined onstage by Bruce Springsteen during performances of the song at Glastonbury Festival 2009 and Hard Rock Calling 2009. In June 2011, the band dedicated the song to the memory of Clarence Clemons during their set at the 2011 Glastonbury Festival. Clemons, a founding member of the E Street Band, had died that same month due to a stroke.

== Track listing ==
All tracks are written by Brian Fallon, Alex Rosamilia, Alex Levine, and Benny Horowitz, except where noted

2008 7" single
No.	Title	Length
1.	"The '59 Sound"	3:11
2.	"Even Cowgirls Get the Blues"	3:31
Total length:		6:42

2009 7" and CD single
No.	Title	Length
1.	"The '59 Sound"	3:11
2.	"State of Love and Trust" (live at Webster Hall, New York City; Eddie Vedder, Jeff Ament, Mike McCready; originally performed by Pearl Jam)	3:27
3.	"We Came to Dance" (live at Webster Hall, New York City)	3:36
Total length:		10:14

== Charts ==
Chart (2009)	Peak position
Canada Rock (Billboard)	26
Scotland (OCC)	64
UK Singles (OCC)	115
UK Indie (OCC)	10
US Alternative Airplay (Billboard)	35
