= Señor and the Queen =

EP by the Gaslight Anthem
- Released: February 4, 2008
- Recorded: August 1–2, 2007
- Genre: Punk rock
- Length: 11:27
- Label: Sabot Productions
- Producers: Brian Fallon, Alex Rosamilia, Alex Levine, Benny Horowitz

The Gaslight Anthem chronology
Sink or Swim (2007)	Señor and the Queen (2008)	The '59 Sound (2008)

Señor and the Queen is an EP by the Gaslight Anthem. It consists of 4 songs and was released in early 2008 by Sabot Productions. It was released simultaneously on vinyl, with the double-7" white (100 copies) and double-7" red editions (500 copies) being the most sought after.

== Reception ==
Professional ratings
Review scores
Source	Rating
AbsolutePunk.net	89% link
Punknews.org	link

Absolutepunk.net, who were very receptive to their debut album Sink or Swim welcomed the release of this EP. "The first half of Señor and the Queen features the standard catchy and fast Gaslight Anthem song. Things really start to get interesting when track three, "Say I Won’t (Recognize)," rolls around." They were very impressed by the use of tempo changes in that song and equally impressed with the band's signs of musical versatility in the slow ballad "Blue Jeans and White T-Shirts." Punknews.org also liked the EP, saying "For now, Señor and the Queen should more than tide anyone over in addition to introducing the band to countless more fans. " They called "Wherefore Art Thou, Elvis?" the catchiest song on the EP and noted guitarist Alex Rosamilia's guitar skills on "Say I Won't (Recognize)." Fallon's impressive songwriting also drew further comparisons to Bruce Springsteen.

== Track listing ==
All tracks are written by Brian Fallon, Alex Rosamilia, Alex Levine, and Benny Horowitz

No.	Title	Length
1.	"Señor and the Queen"	2:05
2.	"Wherefore Art Thou, Elvis?"	3:02
3.	"Say I Won't (Recognize)"	2:52
4.	"Blue Jeans & White T-Shirts"	3:28
Total length:		11:27

== Personnel ==
Band

- Brian Fallon – lead vocals, guitar, producer
- Alex Rosamilia – guitar, backing vocals, producer
- Alex Levine – bass guitar, backing vocals, producer
- Benny Horowitz – drums, percussion, backing vocals, producer

Additional vocalists

- Jet Mullen – additional vocals on "Blue Jeans & White T-Shirts"

Production

- Mike Vasquez – recording engineer, assistant producer
- Che Arthur – assistant producer
- Derron Nuhfer – audio mastering
- Jesse Menn – band photo
- Kenny Colvin – design
