= The Gaslight Anthem =

American rock band

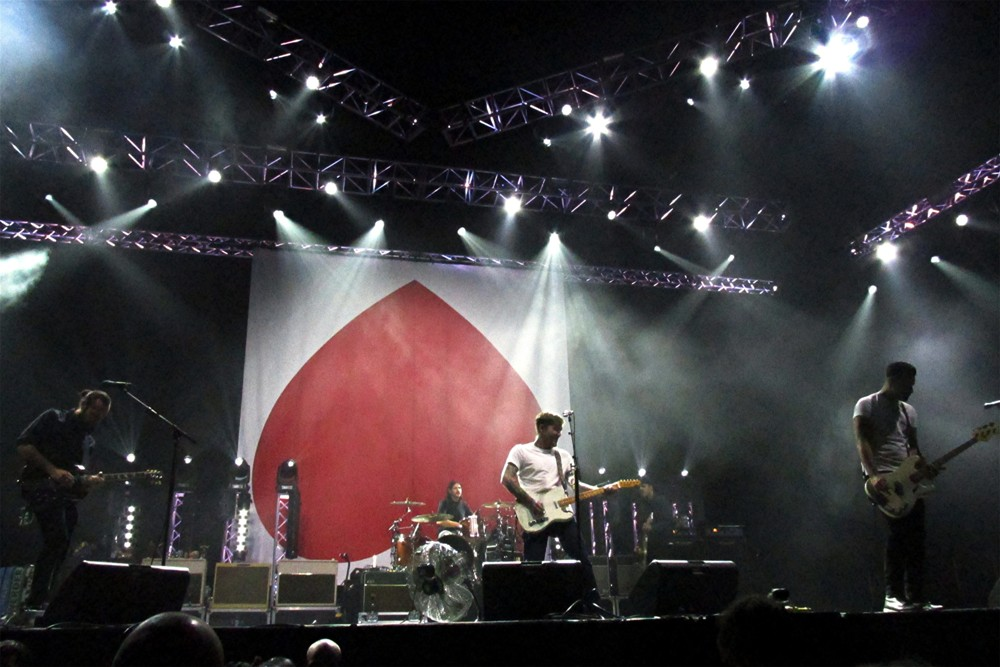
- The Gaslight Anthem live at Alexandra Palace, London, 2014

Background information
- Origin: New Brunswick, New Jersey, United States
- Genres: Heartland rock; punk rock; indie rock; folk punk
- Years active: 2006–2015; 2018; 2022–present
- Labels: Island; SideOneDummy; Sabot Productions; XOXO; Mercury
- Spinoffs: The Horrible Crowes
- Members: Brian Fallon; Alex Rosamilia; Alex Levine; Benny Horowitz
- Website: www.thegaslightanthem.com

The Gaslight Anthem is an American rock band from New Brunswick, New Jersey, formed in 2006. The band consists of Brian Fallon (lead vocals, rhythm guitar, piano), Alex Rosamilia (lead guitar, backing vocals), Alex Levine (bass guitar, backing vocals), and Benny Horowitz (drums, percussion, backing vocals).

The Gaslight Anthem released their debut album, Sink or Swim, on XOXO Records in May 2007, and their second album, The '59 Sound, on SideOneDummy Records in August 2008. The band's third album, American Slang, was released in June 2010, and their fourth, Handwritten, was released in July 2012 through Mercury Records. The lead single from Handwritten, "45", became their most successful single on the charts. The band's fifth studio album, Get Hurt, was released on August 12, 2014, through Island Records. On July 29, 2015, the band announced an indefinite hiatus following their European summer tour, which concluded at Reading Festival on Sunday 30 August. The band temporarily reunited for a string of shows in 2018 to celebrate the 10th anniversary of The '59 Sound, before resuming their hiatus.

In March 2022, the band announced that they had reunited and returned to "full-time status", and that they had begun writing their sixth studio album. The album, titled History Books, was released on October 27, 2023.

== History ==
=== Before the Gaslight Anthem ===
Brian Fallon was in a number of bands prior to the Gaslight Anthem, the most recent one being This Charming Man. The band went through a number of line-up changes, to the point where the band consisted of Fallon, Mike Volpe, Benny Horowitz, and Alex Levine. At this stage, the band renamed themselves to the Gaslight Anthem, due to a change in direction. After this, Volpe left and Alex Rosamilia joined, and the current line-up of the Gaslight Anthem was formed.

The band's first gig was at The Only Game in Town in Somerville, New Jersey, in early 2006.

=== Sink or Swim (2007–2008) ===
The Gaslight Anthem's debut, Sink or Swim, was well received by both independent music review sites such as punknews.org, AbsolutePunk.net, and more mainstream publications such as Spin.com. The song "I Coul'da Been a Contender" was first played on commercial radio by Pete Lepore on "The Punkyard" specialty show on heritage NJ alternative station WHTG, G Rock Radio 106.3/106.5. In 2009, the song "I'da Called You Woody, Joe" was featured as part of the soundtrack of the video games Skate 2 and Skate It.

A 4-song EP titled Señor and the Queen was released on February 5, 2008, through Sabot Productions. A double-7" vinyl version of the EP was also released on standard black vinyl, as well as limited edition pressings on clear vinyl, red vinyl (500 copies), and white vinyl (100 copies).

=== The '59 Sound and breakthrough (2008–2010) ===
The band's second album, The '59 Sound, was released on August 19, 2008, through SideOneDummy Records. The record was produced by Ted Hutt and features Hot Water Music's Chris Wollard and the Mighty Mighty Bosstones' Dicky Barrett as guests. The album was voted the No. 1 album of 2008 by eMusic, and received a high rating from Pitchfork Media.

The first song on the album, "Great Expectations", references the character Estella from the Charles Dickens novel of the same title. In 2008, the band covered "God's Gonna Cut You Down" for the Johnny Cash tribute album All Aboard! A Tribute to Johnny Cash.

On August 6, 2008, the band made British music history becoming the first band to ever appear on the cover of Kerrang! magazine without the magazine having previously written about them. Kerrang! called them "The best new band you'll hear in 2008." In addition, the band received airplay on BBC Radio 6 Music, and embarked on a UK and European tour in November. In August 2009, The Gaslight Anthem won the 2009 Kerrang! Award for "Best International Newcomer".

In 2009, the Gaslight Anthem supported Social Distortion on their European tour and was announced as a supporting act for Bruce Springsteen at Hyde Park Calling. The band performed at Pinkpop on June 1, 2009. At the Glastonbury Festival on June 27, 2009, Springsteen joined the band on stage during their performance of "The '59 Sound." Brian Fallon later contributed to Springsteen's headlining set, performing the song "No Surrender." At London's Hard Rock Calling festival on June 28, Springsteen again joined the band to perform "The '59 Sound", and Fallon again joined Springsteen in singing "No Surrender." The Gaslight Anthem subsequently performed at Lollapalooza in Chicago on August 7, 2009.

=== American Slang (2010–2011) ===
The band's third album, titled American Slang, was released on June 14, 2010, in the UK and June 15, 2010, in the US. According to frontman Brian Fallon, the songwriting on the new album was different than on the band's previous efforts. He named the Rolling Stones, Blues Breakers with Eric Clapton, and Derek and the Dominos as influences.

In addition to five UK dates, the band played at festivals including Bonnaroo Festival, the Austin City Limits Music Festival, Southside Festival, Hurricane Festival, Hard Rock Calling, Rock Werchter, The Guernsey Festival of Performing Arts, A Campingflight to Lowlands Paradise, Reading and Leeds Festivals and Øyafestivalen.

The Gaslight Anthem toured the UK and Europe at the end of 2010 with support from Chuck Ragan and Sharks. They performed two songs from American Slang on Episode 6, Series 37 of Later... with Jools Holland, originally broadcast in the UK on October 22, 2010.

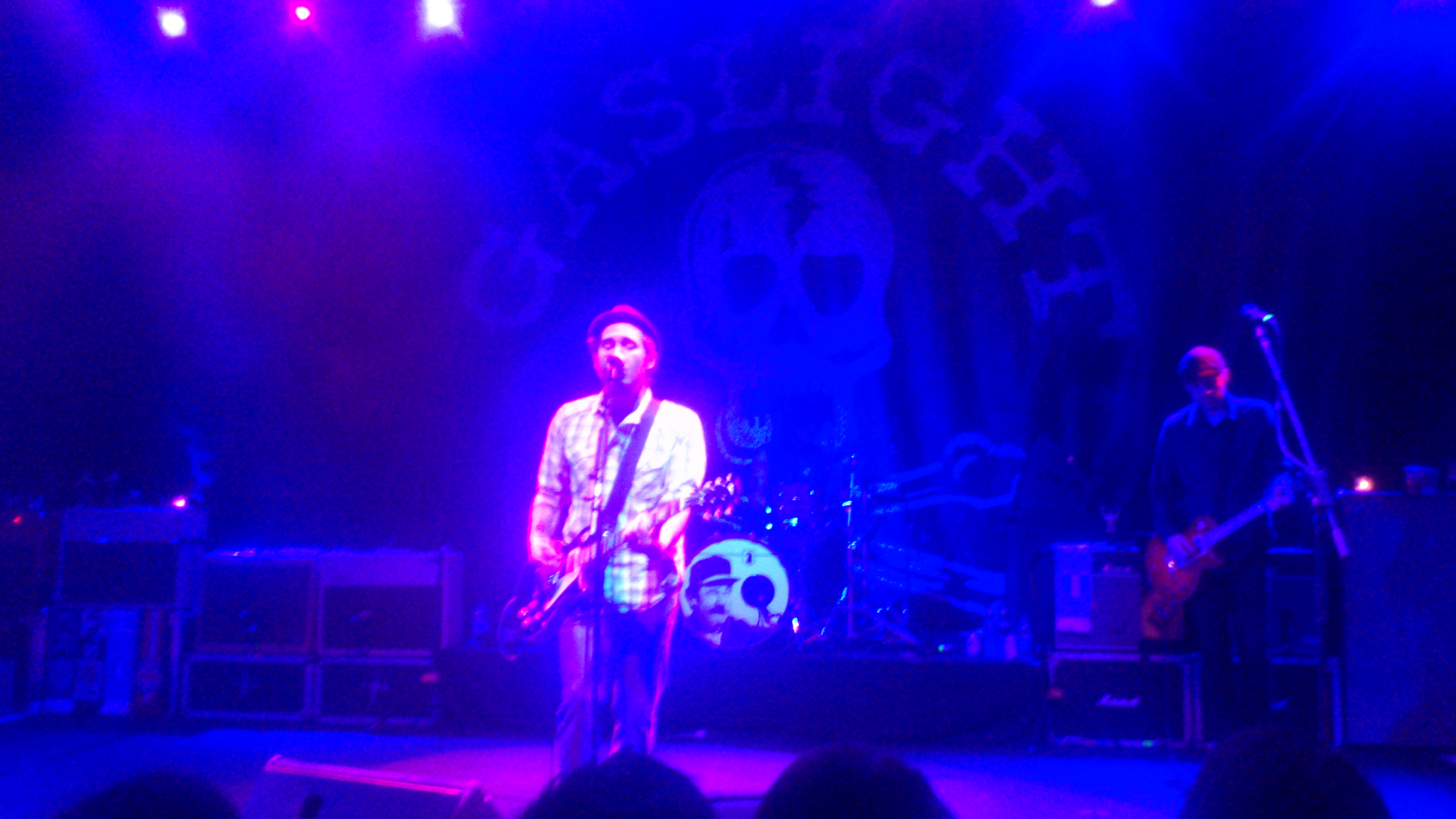
The Gaslight Anthem at Trädgår'n in Göteborg, Sweden, April 6, 2013.

=== Handwritten (2012–2013) ===
In July 2010, Fallon said he was already working on new material for a fourth album. Subsequently, Fallon stated on his blog that the band would start writing their record in January 2011. However, prior to playing on Pinkpop in June 2011, Fallon stated that they had just started working on the new album and that it would not be released for at least a few months. In the same interview, Fallon said only one song was finished so far, referring to Biloxi Parish which they performed on stage at Pinkpop 2011 as well as Rock Am Ring. Fallon stated that the band's next record would sound closer to their breakthrough record, The '59 Sound, rather than American Slang. During this time, Fallon was also working with good friend Ian Perkins on their side project, the Horrible Crowes.

On October 6, 2011, the Gaslight Anthem announced via Facebook that they had signed with Mercury Records. They stated that they were sorry to leave their friends at SideOneDummy, but felt that the change was necessary for their musical career. On October 14, 2011, the band announced that their last show before going into the studio to record their new album would be on December 9, 2011, at the Asbury Park Convention Hall.

On February 22, 2012, the band's Twitter feed announced the forthcoming album would be titled Handwritten. The album was released on July 20, 2012, in Germany, July 23 in the UK, and July 24 in the US.

On September 21, 2012, in Pensacola, Florida, the Gaslight Anthem performed Pearl Jam's "State of Love and Trust" live at DeLuna Fest with Eddie Vedder on vocals. On November 30, 2012, the last of three nights in a row at New York City's Terminal 5 venue, Fallon announced that they would be releasing a live DVD of the previous night's show.

During the 2015–2016 National Hockey League season, a fan vote selected track "Howl" from this album as the goal song for the New Jersey Devils. The song has since played after every Devils goal scored at the Prudential Center in Newark, New Jersey.

=== Get Hurt (2014–2015) ===
The band announced on July 4, 2013, via their Tumblr site, that they were "Working on new songs for a new Gaslight Anthem album in 2014." Fallon cites Pearl Jam's No Code album as an influence and inspiration for the upcoming album.

On July 29, 2013, rumors about the band’s hiatus peaked from a Tumblr post by Brian Fallon. After playing a show in New York City, he explained his frustration about audiences continually requesting Bruce Springsteen covers. “My name isn’t Bruce,” he added.

The band released a limited edition box set titled Singles Collection: 2008-2011 in June 2013. The set compiled nine of the band's 7" singles in a wooden box. In December 2013 the band released their first DVD, titled Live in London, and one month later in January 2014 they released The B-Sides, a collection of acoustic songs, live songs, and outtakes from their various singles.

On March 10, 2014, the band entered Blackbird Studios in Nashville to record their fifth album. The band stated on April 14 that they had arrived at the "last week in the studio" of recording the album.

In an interview with Rolling Stone published May 23, 2014, Fallon described the new record as "completely different than anything we had ever done before. Instead of going that extra step of just adding some organ or some background vocals, this time we actually really changed up a lot of the sounds."

On June 16, 2014, the title of the album was announced as Get Hurt. It was released on August 12, 2014. On July 24, 2014, the music video for the title track debuted.

In 2014, the album's bonus track ("Once Upon a Time") was featured in the 20th Century Fox film Devil's Due.

=== Hiatus and The '59 Sound anniversary tour (2015–2021) ===
On July 29, 2015, the band announced an indefinite hiatus following their European summer tour in support of Get Hurt, which concluded at Reading Festival on Sunday 30 August.

Two and a half years later, on January 3, 2018, it was revealed that the band would be reuniting for Governors Ball Music Festival held on Randall's Island in New York City. The band later announced that they were briefly reuniting for a string of shows celebrating the 10th Anniversary of The '59 Sound. Regarding the decision, Brian Fallon noted, "The big thing between us was let's just do what's fun. So if it's heavy-handed and not that cool, then let's not do it. But we all feel that this is an important record to not only us, but to the people that love it. I would not be on the phone talking about my Sleepwalkers record had it not been for The '59 Sound.".

Fallon stated, however, that the band would not be working on new material during the reunion: "I think Green Day's American Idiot is probably the best comeback or mid-career record that any band has done. So if I was sitting on American Idiot level stuff, then I might push for the, 'Hey guys, maybe we should try these songs out.' But I'm not sitting on that. I don't have a Born to Run in me." Fallon elaborated, "People will always say, 'Why are you doing a solo record?' And I'm like, 'because I don't have anything to say with Gaslight'. Those five records, that's what you got. That’s the piece. I feel it's a lot like The Replacements. There's no new music because that's all Paul Westerberg and the band has to say. When the book is over, it's over. And I have like... four-and-a-half records I’m really proud of."

In June 2018, the band released The 59 Sound Sessions, a 10th anniversary album of nine early versions and B-sides from The '59 Sound. They then celebrated this milestone with a tour through North America and Europe. After the tour's completion, the band reentered its indefinite hiatus, with Brian Fallon releasing two further solo albums, Local Honey (2020) and Night Divine (2021).

=== Reunion and History Books (2022–present) ===
On March 25, 2022, the band announced on Instagram that it was reuniting and working on its sixth studio album, with Brian Fallon posting: "I am very pleased to announce to you all that The Gaslight Anthem is returning to full time status as a band. We’ll be announcing a lot of tour dates in the next couple of days. We’re also beginning to write new songs for what will be our sixth LP. We’re very much looking forward to the future and seeing you all again. We want to thank you for staying with us. Stay tuned!"

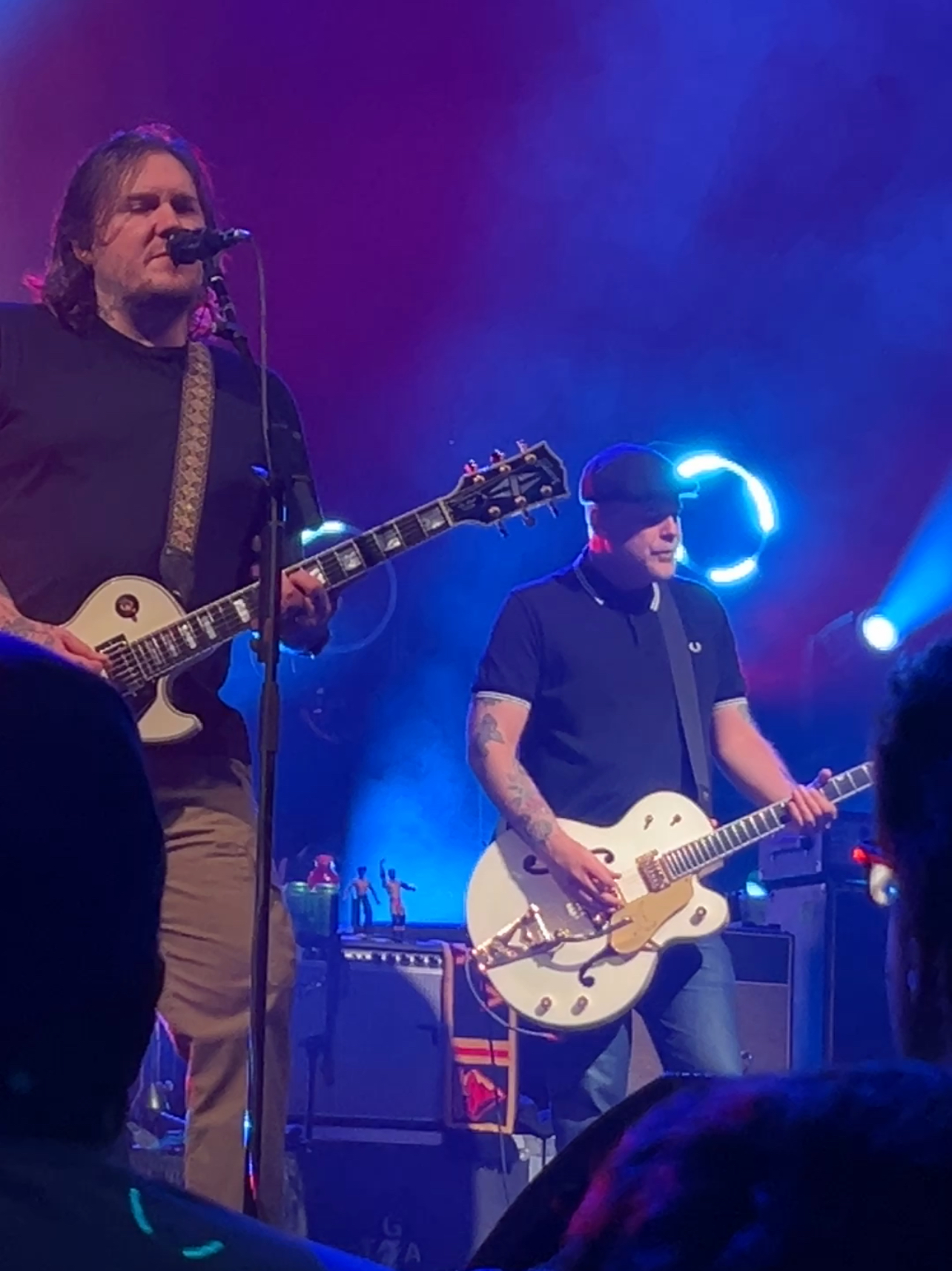
Brian Fallon and Ian Perkins, members of the Gaslight Anthem, performing onstage at the Fillmore Auditorium in Denver, Colorado (October 2, 2023)

A world tour was announced on March 28, with dates across Europe, the UK, and the United States. The tour began at the Columbiahalle in Berlin, Germany, on August 9, 2022, and concluded on October 8, 2022, at the PNC Bank Arts Center in Holmdel, New Jersey, with another round of tour dates across North America throughout May 2023 being announced in February 2023. In December 2022, the band shared on their social media that they had begun recording their sixth studio album. On April 28, 2023, the band released a single, "Positive Charge". It marks their first new music in nine years.

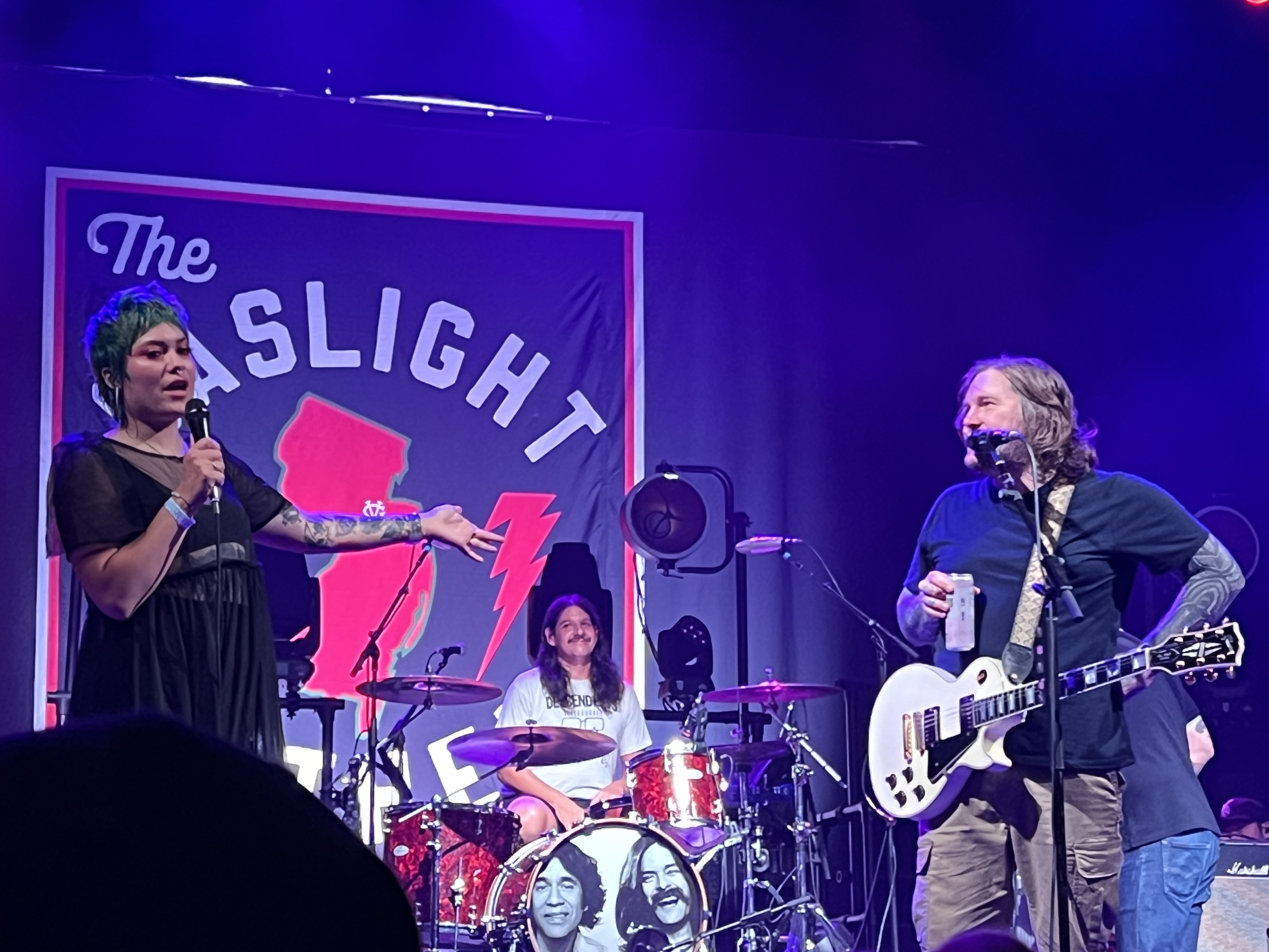
Brian Fallon and Brittany Luna (lead singer of the Catbite band) on stage at the Fillmore Auditorium in Denver, Colorado, during the Gaslight Anthem's fall 2023 tour

On July 21, 2023, the band announced its first studio album in nine years, History Books, which was released on October 27, 2023. The announcement was accompanied by a single of the same name, featuring a guest vocal appearance from Bruce Springsteen. The collaboration came about after the two met up in 2021 and discussed the possibility of Fallon reviving the band, with Springsteen later suggesting that Fallon write them a duet for a prospective project with the band. Of the song and collaboration, Fallon said, "There’s a definitely a little wink in there," alluding to the longstanding comparisons made between the band's sound and Springsteen's. "It’s like 'Now write this off,' we've got the approval of the guy! What are you going to say? You can't say anything!" "Little Fires" was released as the album's third single on September 5, 2023, followed by "Autumn", the record's fourth single, on October 3, accompanied by the announcement of EU/UK tour dates throughout 2024, including a headline slot at 2000 Trees Festival.

History Books was released on October 27, 2023, accompanied by the music video for the record's opening track, "Spider Bites." Following an Instagram post teasing "some extra stuff" on February 10, 2024, the band released a four track companion EP titled History Books - Short Stories on March 22, 2024. Produced by Butch Walker, the EP features acoustic versions of both the title track and lead single "Positive Charge", a re-recorded version of "Blue Jeans & White T-shirts" (originally from their 2008 EP Señor and the Queen) featuring Emily Wolfe, and a cover of Billie Eilish's 2016 track "Ocean Eyes" featuring Karina Rykman, which received its live debut at the Manchester Apollo on the same day as its release.

On February 17, 2024, the Gaslight Anthem performed at the NHL Stadium Series game between the New Jersey Devils and Philadelphia Flyers at MetLife Stadium in East Rutherford, New Jersey. In addition to performing a short three-song set during the first intermission, they played their song "Howl" on stage after each of the Devils' six goals during the game. ("Howl" is the Devils' goal song and the recorded version is played at their home arena, the Prudential Center in Newark, every time the Devils score a goal.)

== Description and influences ==
The New York Times music critic Jon Caramanica described the band as "part of a rich tradition of New Jersey punk, spanning the Misfits to the Bouncing Souls." The Gaslight Anthem's music also embraces many elements of the Jersey Shore sound. Bruce Springsteen has been considered a significant influence on the band's music; however, the band have claimed that they never set out to intentionally sound like him. Representative of such views, one critic wrote, "The Gaslight Anthem are like something out of speculative fiction: this is what pop music would be if Springsteen hadn't listened to his producer, let the Ramones record 'Hungry Heart', and launched the C.B.G.B.'ers into megastardom." Drummer Benny Horowitz and guitarist Alex Rosamilia stated that they are "more Bruce Springsteen appreciators", and that they "didn't start listening to him until [they] joined the band."

Following the release of their third album, American Slang, Fallon himself said, "There's so much else that we look at for our sound and influences that you don't want to be notched in with one guy... There's a lot of things [Springsteen] does that I admire. We come from a lot of the same places but a lot of different places, too. But at the same time, that's a good thing to be compared to. I think it's one of those things we're gonna have to wear until it wears out." Of the Springsteen comparisons, Rosamilia added, "I think there's enough out there on the Internet about that already."

The song "I'da Called You Woody, Joe" is a tribute to Joe Strummer, whom Fallon has frequently spoken about and referenced. Similarly, Tom Petty is referenced in several songs, either by name or through references to particular songs of his. The band has covered Tom Petty and the Heartbreakers' "American Girl" and "Refugee" live. As a bonus track for the deluxe version of Handwritten, the Gaslight Anthem covered the Heartbreakers song "You Got Lucky".

== Band members ==
Current members

- Brian Fallon – lead vocals, rhythm guitar, piano
- Alex Rosamilia – lead guitar, backing vocals
- Alex Levine – bass guitar, backing vocals
- Benny Horowitz – drums, percussion, backing vocals

Current touring musicians

- Ian Perkins – rhythm guitar, backing vocals (2010–2015, 2018, 2022–present)
- Bryan Haring – keyboards, backing vocals (2022–present)

Former members

- Mike Volpe – lead guitar (2006)

Member biographies:

For more information about Brian Fallon and Alex Rosamilia, see Brian Fallon and Alex Rosamilia. Alex Levine is the bassist and background vocalist for the Gaslight Anthem and owner of Idle Hand Barbershop in Bradley Beach, New Jersey.

Benny Horowitz (born 1980) is a musician from Somerville, New Jersey. Horowitz is a founding member and the drummer of the Gaslight Anthem. Prior to full-time touring, Horowitz was an active promoter in the New Jersey punk and hardcore scene from 1994 to 2000, primarily at the Manville Elks Lodge, as well as at venues including the Melody Bar and the Court Tavern in New Brunswick, New Jersey. As a podcast host/producer, Horowitz is the main voice of Going Off Track, a long-running music podcast with which he has been involved with since the early 2010s. He was also co-host/producer of the now-defunct sports themed podcast the Tune Up from 2021 to 2025. Horowitz has also worked as a writer and producer, including on the Every Word Handwritten short film, "Handwritten" and the "Here Comes My Man" music videos, as well as writing/production on the '59 Sound demo sessions book. He has also played the drums for other bands, including the Low End Theory, Mercy Union, Town Liar, and Antartigo Vespucci, culminating in a collection of additional percussion credits.

== Discography ==
- Sink or Swim (2007)
- The '59 Sound (2008)
- American Slang (2010)
- Handwritten (2012)
- Get Hurt (2014)
- History Books (2023)

== See also ==
- Music of New Jersey
