= Sink or Swim (The Gaslight Anthem album) =

2007 studio album by the Gaslight Anthem

Studio album by the Gaslight Anthem
- Released: May 29, 2007
- Genre: Punk rock
- Length: 37:18
- Label: XOXO
- Producers: Brian Fallon, Alex Rosamilia, Alex Levine, Benny Horowitz, Josh Jakubowski

The Gaslight Anthem chronology
Sink or Swim (2007)	Señor and the Queen (2008)

Singles from Sink or Swim
- 1. "I'da Called You Woody, Joe" Released: 2007; 2. "We Came to Dance (Europe)" Released: 2007

Professional ratings
Review scores
Source	Rating
AbsolutePunk.net	(82%) link
Laut.de	link
Punknews.org	link
Stereokill.net	link
Unglued Reviews	(Positive) link

Sink or Swim is the debut studio album by the Gaslight Anthem, released May 29, 2007, through XOXO Records.

== Reception ==
Despite little attention from major critics, the album met with strong reception from independent critics. Absolutepunk.net received the album very positively, citing frontman Brian Fallon for having a "talent for creating lyrics and melodies that are simple and catchy, yet never forced or unintelligent." The review also called "I'da Called You Woody, Joe" (a tribute to Joe Strummer) the highlight of the records, and noted the similarities between the opening track "Boomboxes and Dictionaries" and Against Me!'s “Sink. Florida. Sink.” Punknews.org also praised the album and made many similar observations. They called the record "the type of record that most young bands wish they could create to launch their musical career." Unplugged reviews noted that "The Gaslight Anthem blend anthemic punk-rock spirit with Springsteen-influenced storytelling (together with a folk influence that recalls early Against Me!) to create a compelling, addictive whole." They also expressed appreciation for Fallon's "gruff vocals" and the contrast between up-tempo rockers like "We Came to Dance" and "Red in the Morning" and acoustic folk numbers like "The Navesink Banks" and "Red at Night."

== Release ==
In December 2010, the album was re-released in Europe exclusively on vinyl. This special release was limited to only 500 copies and featured a fold-out lyrics sheet.

== Track listing ==
All tracks are written by Brian Fallon, Alex Rosamilia, Alex Levine, and Benny Horowitz, except where noted

No.	Title	Writer(s)	Length
1.	"Boomboxes and Dictionaries"		3:11
2.	"I Coul'da Been a Contender"		3:22
3.	"Wooderson"		2:11
4.	"We Came to Dance"		3:34
5.	"1930"	Fallon, Rosamilia, Levine, Horowitz, Mike Volpe	3:48
6.	"The Navesink Banks"		2:48
7.	"Red in the Morning"		2:51
8.	"I'da Called You Woody, Joe"		3:21
9.	"Angry Johnny and the Radio"		3:00
10.	"Drive"		2:55
11.	"We're Getting a Divorce, You Keep the Diner"		3:11
12.	"Red at Night"		3:07
Total length:			37:18

== Personnel ==
Band

- Brian Fallon – lead vocals, guitar, harmonica, piano, producer
- Alex Rosamilia – guitar, backing vocals, producer
- Alex Levine – bass guitar, backing vocals, producer
- Benny Horowitz – drums, backing vocals, producer

Production

- Josh Jakubowski – recording engineer, producer
- Jason Livermore – audio mastering
- John Clemmons – photographs
- C. Spliedt – cover painting
- Ed Hanks – layout
