= American Slang =

Studio album by the Gaslight Anthem
- Released: June 15, 2010
- Recorded: February 1 – March 1, 2010
- Studios: Magic Shop, New York City
- Genres: Heartland rock; punk rock; power pop
- Length: 34:13
- Label: SideOneDummy
- Producer: Ted Hutt

The Gaslight Anthem chronology
Live at Park Ave. (2009)	American Slang (2010)	Handwritten (2012)

Singles from American Slang
- 1. "American Slang" Released: March 23, 2010; 2. "Bring it On" Released: 2010; 3. "The Spirit of Jazz" Released: 2010; 4. "The Diamond Church Street Choir" Released: 2010; 5. "Boxer" Released: 2010; 6. "Stay Lucky (Europe only)" Released: 2010; 7. "She Loves You (Europe only)" Released: 2010

American Slang is the third studio album by New Jersey–based rock group the Gaslight Anthem. It was released on June 15, 2010, on SideOneDummy Records, which released their previous album, The '59 Sound. The album was produced by The '59 Sound producer Ted Hutt.

== Writing and recording ==
Lead singer and songwriter Brian Fallon stated in a New York City in-studio session, "All these songs came to me in my head. I didn't sit down at the guitar or piano or write lyrics, they all just were kind of there one day." Fallon said that American Slang would move away from the 1950s-inspired sound of The '59 Sound. He began writing for the new album in the summer of 2009 while on tour in support of The '59 Sound. "American Slang is just what we do. That's who we are," Fallon said. "You’re presented with this American Dream and all these American possibilities—and then there's the reality of what actually happens with your life." In response to the obvious influences Tom Waits, The Clash, The Supremes, and most notably Bruce Springsteen had on their previous records, he went on to add, "This [record] is really the one where we said, ‘All right, well, we’ve got our influences. They’ll speak naturally, but what do we have to say on our own? What does it feel like to put on our own shoes and clothes? What do we sound like, and what's our story?’"

== Release ==
The album was released on June 15, 2010, on SideOneDummy Records, the band's second release for the label. The album opened at No. 16 on the Billboard 200, making it the band's highest charting album at the time. It sold over 26,000 copies in its first week of release. It also debuted at No. 18 and No. 12 on the U.K. and Canadian charts, respectively. The band released the first single from the album, "American Slang", on their Facebook page on March 23, 2010, along with a full track list and cover art.It was followed by singles for "Bring It On", "The Spirit of Jazz", "The Diamond Church Street Choir" and "Boxer". "Stay Lucky" was released as a single in Europe and charted in the Czech Republic. Music videos were made for "American Slang" and "Bring It On".

== Reception ==
Professional ratings
Aggregate scores
Source	Rating
Metacritic	80/100
Review scores
Source	Rating
Absolutepunk	(93%)
AllMusic	4/5 stars
The A.V. Club	A−
Drowned in Sound	8/10 stars
MusicOMH	4.5/5 stars
NME	7/10 stars
Pitchfork	(7.3/10)
PopMatters	8/10 stars
Rock Sound	9/10 stars
Rolling Stone	3.5/5 stars
Slant Magazine	3.5/5 stars
Spin	8/10 stars
Sputnikmusic	4/5 stars

Uncut magazine (July 2010 issue) gave American Slang a 5-star rating and declared it its 'album of the month'. "American Slang delivers spectacularly on all expected fronts. Everything that was great about The '59 Sound is here, but the sound is even bigger, epic without getting blustery." Rock Sound magazine gave the album a 9/10 and also declared it its 'album of the month'.

In December 2010, Exclaim! named American Slang the No. 19 Pop & Rock Album of the year. Exclaim! writer Ben Conoley said, "American Slang is somehow your old man and your best friend all at once."

Big Cheese magazine (June 2010 issue) also gave the album 5 stars, saying that "The Gaslight Anthem have created the all-American album that travels by keeping its subject matter to that which everyone can relate to: the pain of a broken heart, salvation from the radio and love by the lights of the bar. The record is a perfect marriage of expert storytelling, superb musicianship and classic melodies."

Classic Rock magazine gave the album 8/10 and declared that "New and old fans alike will be speaking American Slang this summer."

The album reached the No. 3 position on the UK midweek album charts during its first week.

The album debuted at No. 16 on the Billboard 200, moving 27,000 copies, and was the No. 1 independent album for that week.

"Rolling Stone" magazine gave the album 3½ stars out of five, saying that "American Slang arrives with serious advance buzz: The choruses are more sculpted, but the band's tough-as-leather rush is as hard as ever, and Fallon howls so hard, he sounds like he's aiming to get a section of the Jersey Turnpike named after him."

"Rolling Stone" named the album's song "The Diamond Church Street Choir" at No. 39 on their list of 50 Best Songs Of 2010.

The album holds a Metascore of 80% on Metacritic, based on 28 professional reviews.

== Track listing ==
All tracks are written by Brian Fallon, Alex Rosamilia, Alex Levine, and Benny Horowitz, except where noted

No.	Title	Length
1.	"American Slang"	3:41
2.	"Stay Lucky"	3:09
3.	"Bring It On"	3:27
4.	"The Diamond Church Street Choir"	3:12
5.	"The Queen of Lower Chelsea"	3:39
6.	"Orphans"	3:23
7.	"Boxer"	2:47
8.	"Old Haunts"	3:30
9.	"The Spirit of Jazz"	3:13
10.	"We Did It When We Were Young"	4:16
Total length:		34:17

iTunes bonus tracks
No.	Title	Length
11.	"She Loves You"	3:45
12.	"American Slang" (acoustic; available with pre-orders only)	3:46
Total length:		48:31

Australian tour edition bonus disc
No.	Title	Length
1.	"American Slang" (acoustic)	3:46
2.	"Boxer" (acoustic)
3.	"The Queen Of Lower Chelsea" (acoustic)
4.	"Antonia Jane" (Amber Webber, Joshua Wells; originally performed by Lightning Dust)
5.	"Tumbling Dice" (Mick Jagger, Keith Richards; originally performed by The Rolling Stones)
6.	"She Loves You" (acoustic)	3:45

== Charts ==
Chart (2010)	Peak position
Australian Albums (ARIA Charts)	67
Billboard 200	16
Irish Independent Albums Chart	1

== Personnel ==
Band

- Brian Fallon – lead vocals, guitar
- Alex Rosamilia – guitar, backing vocals
- Alex Levine – bass guitar, backing vocals
- Benny Horowitz – drums, backing vocals

Additional backing vocalists

- Bryan Kienlin
- Pete Steinkopf
- Dave Franklin
- Ted Hutt
- Hollie Fallon
- Tom DuHamel
- Jesse Malin

Production

- Ted Hutt – record producer, mix engineer
- Ryan Mall – recording engineer, mix engineer
- Ted Young – assistant engineer
- Tom Baker – audio mastering
- Jeffrey Everett – design, layout, illustrations
