= The '59 Sound =

Studio album by the Gaslight Anthem
- Released: August 19, 2008
- Recorded: 2008
- Genres: Punk rock; heartland rock; Americana; soul
- Length: 41:32
- Label: SideOneDummy
- Producer: Ted Hutt

The Gaslight Anthem chronology
Señor and the Queen (2008)	The '59 Sound (2008)	Live at Park Ave. (2009)

Singles from The '59 Sound
- 1. "The '59 Sound" Released: 2008; 2. "Old White Lincoln" Released: 2008; 3. "Great Expectations" Released: 2009; 4. "The Backseat" Released: 2009

The '59 Sound is the second studio album by American punk rock band the Gaslight Anthem, released on August 19, 2008, by record label SideOneDummy.

In December 2008, eMusic named The '59 Sound the best album of 2008. NME rated it as the 47th best album of the year. The title track was number 62 on Rolling Stone's list of the 100 Best Songs of 2008.

In July 2009, following Bruce Springsteen's guest appearances with the band at Glastonbury and Hyde Park, sales of the album doubled. In 2018 The Gaslight Anthem released The '59 Sounds Sessions, a companion album to The 59 Sound featuring early versions of songs from the album as well as rarities and b-sides.

== Recording ==
Regarding the differences between The '59 Sound and their first full-length album, Sink or Swim, guitarist Alex Rosamilia noted that, "For Sink or Swim, we had a week or so and what we brought to the studio. For [this] last record we had about 5 weeks and quite the arsenal of gear to tear through. Which did lead to a couple ideas I don't think we would've had otherwise." The album was produced and mixed at Sage and Sound Studios and Mad Dog Studios, and was mastered at Precision Mastering, all in Los Angeles, CA.

== Release ==
The album was released on August 19, 2008, and peaked on the Billboard 200 at #70. A 7" vinyl single was released on July 22, featuring the title track and the song "Even Cowgirls Get the Blues" on the B-side. "Old White Lincoln" was released as the second single on December 1, 2008, in the UK. Opening track "Great Expectations" was released as the third single in the UK on March 23, 2009. In 2014, the bonus track "Once Upon a Time" was featured in the opening sequence and during the end credits of the 20th Century Fox film Devil's Due.

== Influences ==
AllMusic described the album's sound as a "heartland rock version of Social Distortion."

== Reception ==
Professional ratings
Aggregate scores
Source	Rating
Metacritic	79/100
Review scores
Source	Rating
AllMusic	3.5/5 stars
Alternative Press	4/5 stars
NME	9/10
Now	4/5
Pitchfork	8.6/10
PopMatters	7/10
Q	4/5 stars
Slant Magazine	3.5/5 stars
Uncut	3/5 stars

Absolutepunk.net raved about The '59 Sound, writing: "Packed full of vivid imagery and storytelling that resembles Born to Run/Darkness on the Edge of Town-era Springsteen, The '59 Sound is an impeccable work of punk-rock art where each listen offers something new, never taking any hint of imagination or personal effect away from the listener; this is the album The Killers wanted to make with Sam's Town but were unsuccessful at." Mark Deming of AllMusic was generally favorable and concluded that "If Fallon often comes off as a youthful Springsteen wannabe on The '59 Sound, he also happens to be pretty good at it."

== Track listing ==
All tracks are written by Brian Fallon, Alex Rosamilia, Alex Levine, and Benny Horowitz, except where noted.

No.	Title	Length
1.	"Great Expectations"	3:05
2.	"The '59 Sound"	3:09
3.	"Old White Lincoln"	3:23
4.	"High Lonesome"	3:05
5.	"Film Noir"	3:29
6.	"Miles Davis & The Cool"	4:11
7.	"The Patient Ferris Wheel"	3:34
8.	"Casanova, Baby!"	2:57
9.	"Even Cowgirls Get the Blues"	3:30
10.	"Meet Me by the River's Edge"	3:19
11.	"Here's Looking at You, Kid"	3:36
12.	"The Backseat"	4:14
Total length:		41:32

iTunes bonus track
No.	Title	Length
13.	"Once Upon a Time" (Robert Bradley; originally performed by Robert Bradley's Blackwater Surprise)	3:58
Total length:		45:30

== Personnel ==
The Gaslight Anthem

- Brian Fallon – lead vocals, guitar
- Alex Rosamilia – guitar, backing vocals, Wollensack
- Alex Levine – bass guitar, backing vocals
- Benny Horowitz – drums, tubular bells, tambourine, garbage cans, chains

Additional personnel

- Chris Wollard – additional vocals
- Joe Sirois – additional vocals
- Dicky Barrett – additional vocals
- Hollie Fallon – additional vocals
- Joe Sib – additional vocals
- Kim Yarbrough – additional vocals
- Gia Ciambotti – additional vocals
- Ryan Mall – samples

Production

- Ted Hutt – production, mix engineering
- Ryan Mall – production assistance, mix engineering
- Tom Baker – audio mastering
- Lisa Johnson – sleeve photography
- Jonas Kleiner – art direction, design
