= Alex Rosamilia =

American musician (born 1982)

- Born: Alexander Rosamilia
- Origin: New Brunswick, New Jersey, US
- Genres: Alternative rock, punk rock, hardcore, heavy metal
- Instruments: Guitar, backing vocals
- Labels: Mercury Records; SideOneDummy; Resist records

Alex Rosamilia (born 1982) is an American musician. Rosamilia is one of the founding members of the band The Gaslight Anthem. He plays lead guitar and provides backing vocals for the band.

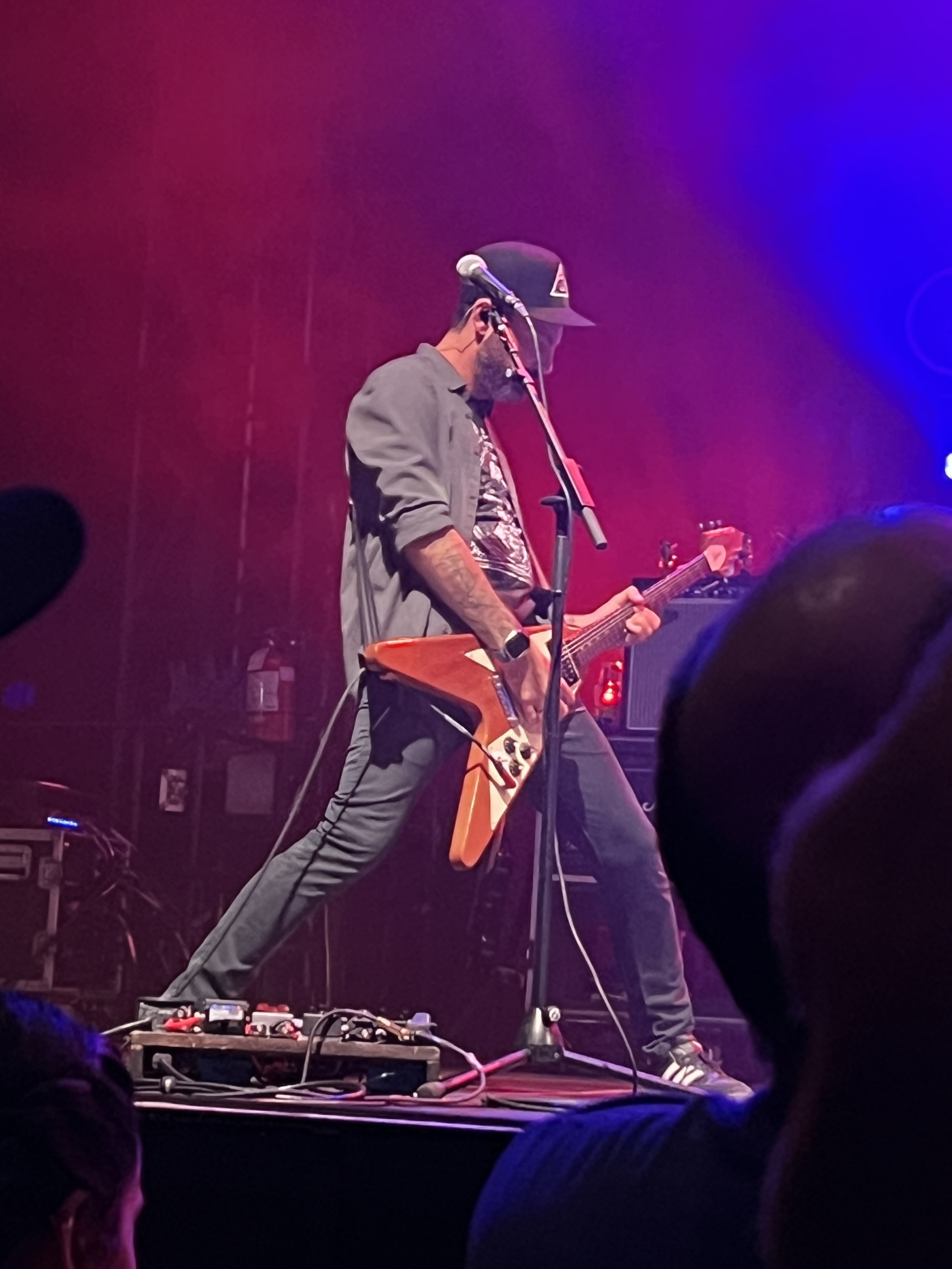
Alex Rosamilia, guitarist for The Gaslight Anthem, onstage at the Fillmore Auditorium in Denver, Colorado (October 2, 2023)

== Biography ==
Early in his career he was involved in The Killing Gift, which also included drummer Benny Horowitz, now of The Gaslight Anthem. Rosamilia has been the lead guitarist for The Gaslight Anthem since their formation in early 2006. With the band he has recorded six studio albums, Sink or Swim, The '59 Sound, American Slang, Handwritten, Get Hurt and History Books.

He was also active in the band Spiro Agnew which is essentially The Killing Gift line-up without a vocalist.

In 2010, Rosamilia started the hardcore metal band Something About Death or Dying and released a five-song digital only E.P. on 11 November 2010 with Darrell Coco, bassist of Spiro Agnew, vocalist Dan Pelic, and drummer Wes Kleinknecht.

Rosamilia and Pelic worked together again to form another metal project dubbed Servitude in 2013 and released an E.P., "No Foxhole Prayers", in 2015. The band includes Brad Clifford (formerly of Poison The Well and Sincebyman) on second guitar, Corey Perez (of Ensign and I Am The Avalanche) on bass and drummer Eric Schnee (of Organ Dealer).

== Discography ==
With The Gaslight Anthem

- Sink or Swim Demos (7" vinyl) (2006)
- Sink or Swim (2007)
- Señor and the Queen EP (CD & double 7" vinyl) (2008)
- The '59 Sound (2008)
- Live at Park Ave. EP (10" vinyl) (2009)
- American Slang (2010)
- Tumbling Dice / She Loves You EP (7" vinyl) (2010)
- Handwritten (2012)
- Get Hurt (2014)
- History Books (2023)

With Something About Death or Dying

- Something About Death Or Dying Downloadable Demo (2010)

With The Killing Gift

- Who Watches the Watchmen? (2004)

With Servitude

- No Foxhole Prayers (2015)
