= Doro Pesch discography =

Warlock discography
- Studio albums: 4
- Extended plays: 1
- Compilation albums: 2
- Tribute albums: 1
- Singles: 7
- Video albums: 4
- Music videos: 3
- Warlock demos: 4
- Warlock bootlegs: 6

Doro discography
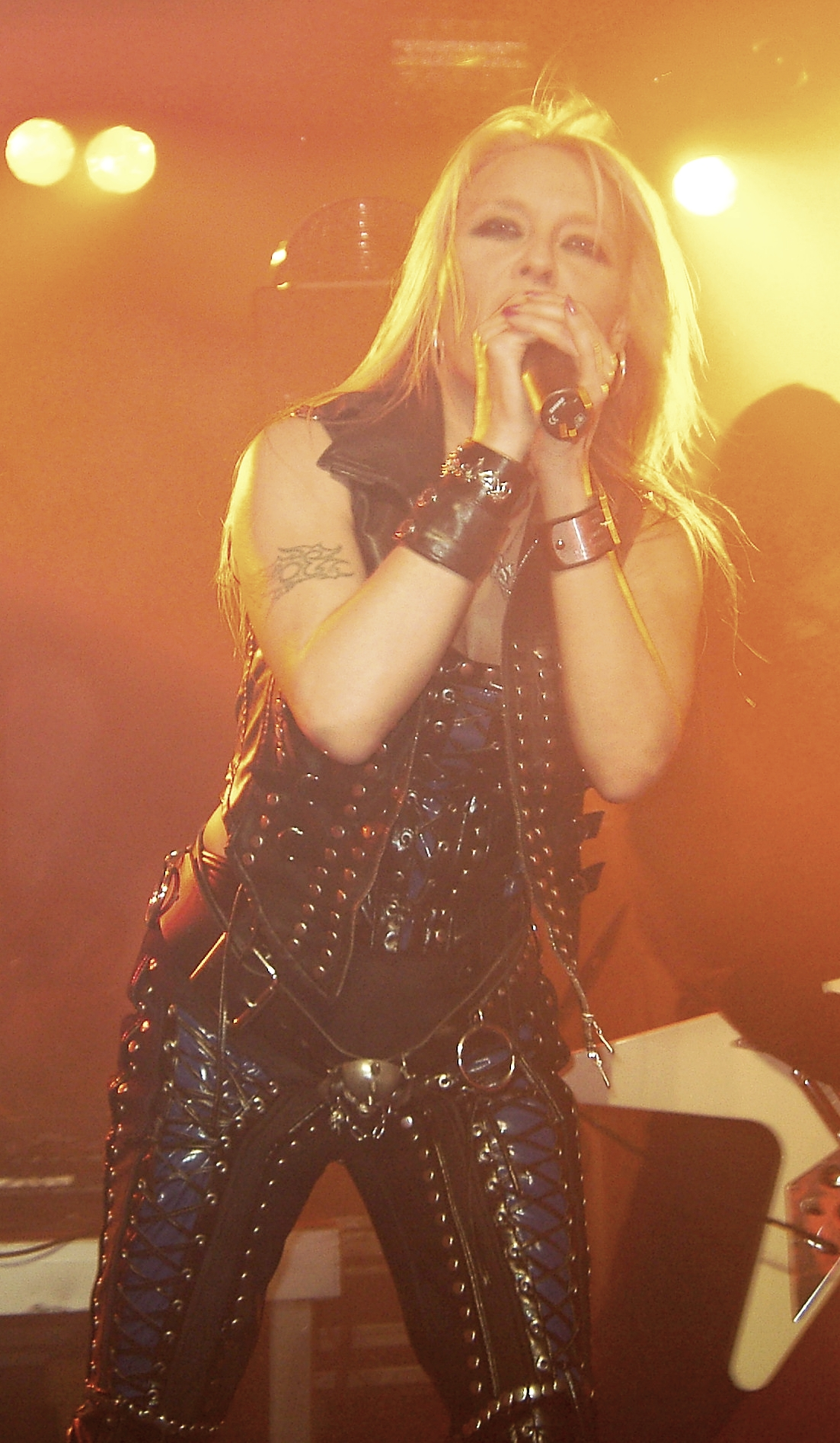
- Doro in 2006
- Studio albums: 14
- Extended plays: 9
- Live albums: 2
- Compilation albums: 9
- Singles: 23
- Video albums: 6
- Music videos: 16

Doro Pesch is a German heavy metal singer that started her career in native Düsseldorf in the early 80s with the underground bands Snakebite and Beast. In 1982, she joined the German heavy metal band Warlock, which got its first contract with the Belgian independent label Mausoleum Records to record the album Burning the Witches. The new band quickly entered the circuit of the most sought-after support bands in the European metal live shows of the '80s, receiving enthusiastic reviews and gaining a solid fan base. Warlock soon stepped up to main attraction on European tours and their albums, issued under the Vertigo label, sold well in Germany and caught the attention of US promoters, who organized a tour in the United States. Their fourth album Triumph and Agony was produced in the US and entered the Billboard 200 chart, thanks also to the videos of the songs "All We Are" and "Für Immer" on rotation on MTV. By 1988, all German members of the band, except Doro, were replaced by American musicians and Warlock ceased to exist, because of legal problems about the rights on the name and logo.

Doro started her solo recording career with the album Force Majeure, fulfilling her contract with the Vertigo label until 1995 with other four studio albums. Because of the lack of charting success, her second Gene Simmons-produced, eponymous album in 1990 was the last one issued in the US until Calling the Wild, ten years later. However, Doro's albums always charted in Germany and other European countries, with very good sales of singles in recent years both in Germany and in Spain. The 2004 album Classic Diamonds was a collaboration with the Classic Night Orchestra, which reworked some of her earlier songs with symphonic and acoustic arrangements. Doro is now a veteran singer in the heavy metal world and she often features in duets with other singers and bands.

The compilation Rare Diamonds of 1991 has songs from both Warlock albums and Doro's first albums and is listed twice.

== Snakebite demo ==
- Jolly Joker (1983)

== Beast demo ==
- Paradies (1983)

== Warlock albums ==
=== Studio albums ===
Year	Album details	Peak chart positions				Certifications (sales thresholds)
Year	Album details	GER	SWI	UK	US	Certifications (sales thresholds)
1984	Burning the Witches: Released: 1984; Label: Mausoleum (SKULL 8325); Format: LP, CD	39	—	—	—	
1985	Hellbound: Released: 29 May 1985; Label: Vertigo (824 660-1Q); Format: CD, CS, LP	53	—	—	—	
1986	True as Steel: Released: 18 August 1986; Label: Vertigo (830 237–1); Format: CD, CS, LP	18	—	—	—	
1987	Triumph and Agony: Released: 5 September 1987; Label: Vertigo (832 804–1); Format: CD, CS, LP	23	30	54	80	GER: Gold
"—" denotes releases that did not chart or were not released in that country.

=== Compilation albums ===
Year	Album details	Peak chart	
Year	Album details	GER	SWI
1991	Rare Diamonds: Released: March 1991; Label: Vertigo (848 353–1); Format: CD, CS, LP	37	33
1999	Earth Shaker Rock: Released: 20 September 1999; Label: Connoisseur Collection (VSOP CD 247); Format: CD	—	—
"—" denotes releases that did not chart or were not released in that country.

=== Extended plays ===
- Fight for Rock (1986)

=== Singles ===
Year	Titles	Album
1984	"Without You / Burning the Witches"	Burning the Witches
1985	"All Night / Hellbound"	Hellbound
1986	"You Hurt My Soul (On and On) / Evil / Turn It On"	Non-album tracks
1987	"All We Are / Three Minutes Warning"	Triumph and Agony
1987	"East Meets West / I Rule the Ruins"	Triumph and Agony
1987	"Für Immer / Metal Tango"	Triumph and Agony

=== Demos ===
- 1983 demo (1983)
- Mausoleum Demo (1983)

=== Bootlegs ===
- Metalbound (1985, LP, live recording with the first line-up, from 14 September 1985)
- More Doro Power (1986, LP, live recording with the second line-up, from 11 December 1985)
- Ready for Promotion (1986, LP, live recording with the second line-up, from 16 August 1986)
- The Last Witch (1987, LP, live recording with the first line-up)
- True as Steel + Triumph and Agony (2001, CD, Russian release, double album)
- Music Box (2003, CD, Top Rec., Russian release, compilation)

=== Tribute album ===
- Tribute to Steel (2008)

=== Video albums ===
- Metal Racer (1985)
- The Videos (listed as Doro & Warlock, 1989)
- Rare Diamonds (1991)
- Doro Pesch and Warlock: Live (2001)

=== Music videos ===
Year	Song	Director	Ref
1986	"Fight for Rock"	Gerald Distl	
1987	"All We Are"	Mark Rezyka	
1988	"Für immer"	Mark Rezyka	

== Doro albums ==
=== Studio albums ===
Year	Album details	Peak chart positions					Certifications
Year	Album details	GER	AUT	GRE	SWI	US	Certifications
1989	Force Majeure: Released: February 1989; Label: Vertigo (838 016–1); Format: CD, CS, LP	5	—	—	12	154	BVMI: Gold
1990	Doro: Released: May 1990; Label: Vertigo (846 194–1); Format: CD, CS, LP	9	—	—	22	—	
1991	True at Heart: Released: 4 August 1991; Label: Vertigo (510 102–1); Format: CD, LP	19	—	—	26	—	
1993	Angels Never Die: Released: February 1993; Label: Vertigo (514 309–1); Format: CD, LP	21	—	—	31	—	
1995	Machine II Machine: Released: March 1995; Label: Vertigo (526 804–2); Format: CD, LP	33	—	—	38	—	
1998	Love Me in Black: Released: 25 May 1998; Label: WEA (3984 22814–2); Format: CD	38	—	—	—	—	
2000	Calling the Wild: Released: 1 September 2000; Label: SPV/Steamhammer (SPV 085-72042 CD); Format: CD, LP	16	—	—	—	—	
2000	Calling the Wild US ed.: Released: 12 September 2000; Label: Koch (KOC-CD-8151); Format: CD	—	—	—	—	—	
2002	Fight: Released: 24 September 2002; Label: SPV/Steamhammer (SPV 087-74100 CD-E); Format: CD	18	—	38	100	—	
2004	Classic Diamonds: Released: 20 September 2004; Label: AFM (AFM 085–2); Format: CD	33	—	—	—	—	
2006	Warrior Soul: Released: 24 March 2006; Label: AFM (AFM 107–9); Format: CD	27	—	—	—	—	
2009	Fear No Evil: Released: 23 January 2009; Label: AFM (AFM 233–2); Format: CD, LP	11	51	—	56	—	
2012	Raise Your Fist: Released: 19 October 2012; Label: Nuclear Blast (B008ZAB32G); Format: CD, LP	16	50	—	52	—	
2018	Forever Warriors, Forever United: Released: 17 August 2018; Label: Nuclear Blast; Format: CD, LP	4	23	—	13	—	
2023	Conqueress – Forever Strong and Proud: Released: 27 October 2023; Label: Nuclear Blast; Format: CD, LP	5	7	—	23	—	
"—" denotes releases that did not chart or were not released in that country.

=== Live albums ===
Year	Album details	Peak chart
Year	Album details	GER
1993	Doro Live: Released: 1 November 1993; Label: Vertigo (518 680–1); Format: CD, LP	71
2010	25 Years in Rock... and Still Going Strong: Released: 26 November 2010; Label: Nuclear Blast (NB 2637–9); Format: CD, LP	61
2016	Strong and Proud: Released: 24 June 2016; Label: AFM (AFM 341–9); Format: CD	11

=== Compilation albums ===
Year	Album details	Peak chart				
Year	Album details	GER	SWI			
1991	Rare Diamonds: Released: March 1991; Label: Vertigo (848 353–1); Format: CD, CS, LP	37	33			
1995	A Whiter Shade of Pale: Released: 15 August 1995; Label: Spectrum (551 459–2); Format: CD	—	—			
1998	Best Of: Released: 1998; Label: Vertigo / Mercury (538 185–2); Format: CD	—	—			
1998	The Ballads: Released: 1998; Label: Vertigo / Mercury (846 393–2); Format: CD	85	—			
2008	Metal Queen - B-Sides & Rarities: Released: 30 September 2008; Label: No Remorse / SPV/Steamhammer (NRR-2004/2005); Format: CD	—	—			
2010	The Doro / Warlock Collection: Released: 16 March 2010; Label: Universal Music Group; Format: 3 CD boxed set	—	—			
2012	Under My Skin: A Fine Selection of Doro Classics: Released: 6 July 2012; Label: AFM (AFM 341–9); Format: 2 CD boxed set	53	—			
2017	Für immer: Released: 27 October 2017; Label: Nuclear Blast (B008ZAB32G); Format: CD, LP	16	89			
2025	Warriors of the Sea: Released: 24 October 2025; Label: Rare Diamonds; Format: CD, LP	9	21	—	79	—
"—" denotes releases that did not chart or were not released in that country.

=== Extended plays ===
Year	Album details	Peak chart	
Year	Album details	GER	SPA
1995	Machine II Machine: Electric Club Mixes: Released: September 1995; Label: Vertigo (528 724–2); Format: EP, CD	—	—
1998	Love Me in Black: Released: 1998; Label: WEA (398424550–2); Format: EP, CD	—	—
2004	Let Love Rain on Me: Released: 9 August 2004; Label: AFM (AFM 085–5); Format: CD	65	7
2005	In Liebe und Freundschaft: Released: 11 November 2005; Label: AFM (AFM 102–5); Format: CD	92	—
2007	All We Are – The Fight: Released: 25 May 2007; Label: AFM (AFM 172–2); Format: CD	—	—
2007	Anthems for the Champion - The Queen: Released: 30 November 2007; Label: AFM (AFM 203–5); Format: CD	89	—
2008	Celebrate - The Night of the Warlock: Released: 31 October 2008; Label: AFM (AFM 233–5); Format: CD	75	3
2008	Herzblut: Released: 12 December 2008; Label: AFM (AFM 233–4); Format: CD	71	—
2012	Raise Your Fist in the Air: Released: 1 April 2016; Label: Nuclear Blast (NB 2913–0); Format: CD	78	—
2016	Love's Gone to Hell: Released: 1 April 2016; Label: Nuclear Blast; Format: CD	—	—
2019	Backstage to Heaven: Released: 2019; Label: Nuclear Blast; Format: Digital download	—	—
"—" denotes releases that did not chart or were not released in that country.

=== Singles ===
Year	Titles	Peak chart positions	Album
Year	Titles	GER	Album
1989	"A Whiter Shade of Pale / Angels with Dirty Faces"	—	Force Majeure
1989	"Hard Times / Für Immer (live)"	—	Force Majeure
1990	"Unholy Love / Broken"	—	Doro
1991	"Cool Love / Live It"	—	True at Heart
1991	"Fall for Me Again / Cool Love / Gettin' Nowhere Without You"	—	True at Heart
1993	"I'll Make It on My Own / Beyond the Trees / You Gonna Break My Heart"	—	True at Heart
1993	"Enough for You / You Ain't Lived (Till You're Loved to Death)"	—	Angels Never Die
1993	"Bad Blood / Children of the Night / Eye on You"	89	Angels Never Die
1993	"Last Day of My Life / Rock Angel / Rare Diamond (live)"	—	Angels Never Die
1993	"Alles Ist Gut / Für Immer / Last Day of My Life"	—	Angels Never Die
1995	"Ceremony / Tie Me Up"	—	Machine II Machine
1995	"In Freiheit Stirbt Mein Herz / Dirty Diamonds / You Got Me Singing"	—	Machine II Machine
1998	"Do You Like It / Pain / Poison Arrow"	—	Love Me in Black
1998	"Long Way Home / Prisoner of Love"	—	Love Me in Black
2000	"Burn It Up / US National Anthem"	—	Calling the Wild
2000	"Ich Will Alles / Give Me a Reason / Rip Me Apart"	—	Calling the Wild
2001	"White Wedding / I Adore You"	—	Calling the Wild
2002	"Fight / Fight by Your Side / Toujours pour Garder"	—	Fight
2003	"Für Immer"	—	Für Immer
2005	"We're Like Thunder / She's Like Thunder" (featuring Regina Halmich)	—	Non-album track
2006	"Tief in meinem Herzen – Borussia Dortmund"	—	Non-album track
2009	"We Are the Metalheads"	—	Non-album track
2011	"Merry Metal X-Mas"	—	Non-album track
"—" denotes singles that did not chart, have not charted yet, or were not released.

=== Other appearances ===
Year	Song	Album	Comments
1991	"Let Love Conquer the World"	German Rock Project - Let Love Conquer the World maxi-single	Charity song by German rock artists
1999	"Egypt (The Chains Are On)"	Holy Dio: Tribute to Ronnie James Dio	
2001	"Wings of Freedom"	German Rock Stars – Wings of Freedom maxi single	Tribute song for the victims of 11 September 2001
2002	"Babe I'm Gonna Leave You"	The Music Remains the Same: A Tribute to Led Zeppelin	
2003	"Only You"	A Tribute to the Creatures of the Night	The same song included in the album Doro for a Kiss tribute album
2004	"Believe in Yourself", "Key to Our Dream"	Sevens	Lead singer on two songs of the third album by Czech progressive metal band Seven
2006	"On My Own", "Warrior Soul", "The Quest"	Anuk - Der Weg Des Kriegers	Original songs for the soundtrack of the eponymous movie, where Doro starred
2008	"O Christmas Tree"	We Wish You a Metal Xmas and a Headbanging New Year deluxe edition	Metal version of a Christmas classic previously released for download on Eagle Rock Entertainment website.
2011	"Nothing Else Matters"	Metallica - A Tribute to the Black Album	
2017	"Leigh Woods"	Sam Russell - Impetuous Desire	Power ballad on Sam Russell's first heavy metal album

=== Video albums ===
Year	Album details	Certifications (sales thresholds)
1991	Rare Diamonds: Released: March 1991; Label: PolyGram (082 664–3); Format: VHS	
1993	Doro Live '93: Released: 1993; Label: PolyGram (088 956–3); Format: VHS	
2003	Für Immer: Released: 1 December 2003; Label: SPV/Steamhammer (SPV 556–74947); Format: 2xDVD	BVMI: Gold
2004	Classic Diamonds - The DVD: Released: 13 December 2004; Label: AFM Records (AFM 085–8); Format: DVD	
2006	20 Years – A Warrior Soul: Released: 2006; Label: AFM Records (AFM 141–7); Format: 2xDVD, BD	
2010	25 Years in Rock... and Still Going Strong: Released: 26 November 2010; Label: Nuclear Blast (NB 2637–9); Format: 2xDVD + CD, BD	
2016	Strong and Proud: Released: 24 June 2016; Label: AFM (AFM 341–9); Format: 3xDVD, BD	
"—" denotes releases that did not chart or were not released in that country.

=== Music videos ===
Year	Song	Director	Ref
1989	"A Whiter Shade of Pale"	Jeff Stein	
1989	"Hard Times"	Jeff Stein	
1990	"Unholy Love"	Jeff Stein	
1990	"Rare Diamond"	Chuck Fishbein	
1991	"Fall for Me Again"	John Warwicker	
1993	"Bad Blood"	Vincent Giordano	
1993	"Last Day of My Life"	Vincent Giordano	
1995	"Ceremony"	???	
1995	"In Freiheit Stirbt Mein Herz"	???	
1998	"Love Me in Black"	???	
2001	"White Wedding"	Vanessa Warwick	
2002	"Fight"	Patrick von Schuckmann	
2002	"Always Live to Win"	Patrick von Schuckmann	
2004	"Let Love Rain on Me"	Patrick von Schuckmann	
2006	"Warrior Soul"	Luke Gasser	
2008	"Herzblut"	Patrick von Schuckmann	
2012	"Raise Your Fist in the Air"	Patrick von Schuckmann	
2016	"Love's Gone to Hell"		

== Duets ==
- 21 April 1997: Die Krupps feat. Doro Pesch - "Taste of Taboo" (on Paradise Now)
- 1 September 2000: Doro Pesch feat. Lemmy - "Love Me Forever", "Alone Again" on Calling the Wild
- 22 October 2000: Motörhead feat. Doro Pesch - "Born to Raise Hell" (on Live at Brixton Academy - live)
- December 2000: Dio feat. Doro Pesch - "Man on the Silver Mountain", "Long Live Rock'n'Roll" (live)
- May 2001: Mägo de Oz feat. Doro Pesch - "Man on the Silver Mountain" (Rainbow cover)
- 3 August 2001: Holy Moses feat. Doro Pesch - "Too Drunk to Fuck" (Dead Kennedys cover - live)
- 21 October 2001: Powergod feat. Doro Pesch - "Burning the Witches" (on Bleed for the Gods: That's Metal - Lesson I)
- 25 March 2002: Udo Dirkschneider feat. Doro Pesch - "Dancing with an Angel" (on Man and Machine)
- 10 May 2002: Killer feat. Doro Pesch - "All We Are", "Burning the Witches" (on Mausoleum - The Official 20th Anniversary Concert Album - live)
- 5 August 2002: Crown of Thorns feat. Doro Pesch - "Shed No Tears" (on Karma)
- 24 September 2002: Doro Pesch feat. Peter Steele - "Descent" on Fight
- 13 December 2003: Doro Pesch feat. Udo Dirkschneider - "East Meets West" on 20 Years – A Warrior Soul (live)
- 13 December 2003: Doro Pesch feat. Jean Beauvoir - "White Wedding" on 20 Years - A Warrior Soul (live)
- 13 December 2003: Doro Pesch feat. Blaze Bailey - "Bad Blood" on 20 Years - A Warrior Soul (live)
- 13 December 2003: Doro Pesch feat. Lemmy and Mikkey Dee - "Love Me Forever" on 20 Years - A Warrior Soul (live)
- 13 December 2003: Doro Pesch feat. Saxon - "You've Got Another Thing Comin'" (Judas Priest cover - live) on 20 Years - A Warrior Soul
- 13 December 2003: Doro Pesch feat. Claus Lessmann - "Born to Be Wild" on 20 Years - A Warrior Soul (live)
- 6 August 2004: Doro Pesch feat. Blaze Bayley - "Fear of the Dark" (Iron Maiden cover - live) on Classic Diamonds – The DVD
- 20 September 2004: Doro Pesch feat. Udo Dirkschneider - "Breaking the Law" (Judas Priest cover) on Classic Diamonds
- 22 August 2005: Destruction feat. Doro Pesch - "The Alliance of Hellhoundz" (on Inventor of Evil)
- 12 September 2005: Doro Pesch feat. Regina Halmich - "We're Like Thunder"
- 25 November 2005: Dirk Bach feat. Doro Pesch - "Gimme Gimme Gimme" (ABBA cover)
- 17 October 2006: Twisted Sister feat. Doro Pesch - "White Christmas" (on A Twisted Christmas)
- 2006: Doro Pesch feat. Marc Storace & Luke Gasser - "On My Own" on Anuk - Der Weg Des Kriegers soundtrack
- 25 March 2006: Ministry feat. Jørn Lande vs. Doro Pesch - "All We Are" (live)
- 21 April 2006: Dezperadoz feat. Doro Pesch - "Earp's Vendetta" (on The Legend and the Truth)
- 23 April 2007: After Forever feat. Doro Pesch - "Who I Am" (on After Forever)
- October 2007: Kreyson feat. Doro Pesch - "Deep in the Night"
- 19 October 2007: Doro Pesch feat. Sabina Classen - "All We Are" (live)
- 23 June 2008 - Judas Priest feat. Doro Pesch - "Breaking the Law" (live)
- 31 October 2008: Kissin' Time feat. Doro Pesch - "All We Are" (live)
- 31 October 2008: Doro Pesch feat. Biff Byford - "Celebrate"
- 31 October 2008: Doro Pesch feat. Sabina Classen, Floor Jansen, Angela Gossow, Veronica Freeman, Liv Kristine, Ji-In Cho, Liv Jagrell, Girlschool - "Celebrate"
- 1 December 2008: Tarja Turunen feat. Doro Pesch - "The Seer"
- 13 December 2008: Doro Pesch feat. Bobby Ellsworth - "Always Live to Win" on 25 Years in Rock... and Still Going Strong (live)
- 13 December 2008: Doro Pesch feat. Jean Beauvoir - "Burn It Up" on 25 Years in Rock... and Still Going Strong (live)
- 13 December 2008: Doro Pesch feat. Sabina Classen, Floor Jansen, Liv Kristine, Ji-In Cho, Liv Jagrell, Girlschool on 25 Years in Rock... and Still Going Strong (live)
- 13 December 2008: Doro Pesch feat. Tarja Turunen - "Walking with the Angels" on 25 Years in Rock... and Still Going Strong (live)
- 13 December 2008: Doro Pesch feat. Chris Boltendahl & Axel Rudi Pell - "East Meets West" on 25 Years in Rock... and Still Going Strong (live)
- 13 December 2008: Doro Pesch feat. Klaus Meine & Rudolph Schenker - "Big City Nights", "Rock You Like a Hurricane" on 25 Years in Rock... and Still Going Strong (live)
- 13 December 2008: Doro Pesch feat. Warrel Dane - "True as Steel" on 25 Years in Rock... and Still Going Strong (live)
- 13 December 2008: Doro Pesch feat. Honza K.B. Hunek - "Unholy Love" on 25 Years in Rock... and Still Going Strong (live)
- 23 January 2009: Doro Pesch feat. Tarja Turunen - "Walking with the Angels" on Fear No Evil
- 2009: Saxon feat. Doro Pesch - "747 (Strangers in the Night)" (live)
- 29 July 2009: Skyline feat. Doro Pesch - "We Are the Metalheads - Wacken Anthem"
- 28 August 2009: Saltatio Mortis feat. Doro Pesch - "Salomé" (on Wer Wind Sät)
- 2010: Motörhead feat. Doro Pesch - "Killed by Death", "Born to Raise Hell" (live)
- 3 August 2010: Grave Digger feat. Doro Pesch - "The Ballad of Mary (Queen of Scots)" (on The Clans Are Still Marching - live)
- 2011: Saxon feat. Doro Pesch - "Denim and Leather" (live)
- 22 April 2011: Krypteria feat. Doro Pesch - "Victoria" (on All Beauty Must Die)
- 9 September 2011: Doro Pesch feat. Mark Tornillo - "East Meets West" (live)
- 26 September 2011: Girlschool feat. Doro Pesch - "Hit and Run" (on Hit and Run – Revisited)
- 30 September 2011: Sister Sin feat. Doro Pesch - "Rock 'n' Roll" (Motörhead cover)
- 9 December 2011: Doro Pesch feat. Tom Angelripper - "Merry Metal X-Mas"
- 19 October 2012: Doro Pesch feat. Lemmy - "It Still Hurts" on Raise Your Fist
- 23 November 2012: Die Happy feat. Doro Pesch - "Good Things" (1000th Show Live)
- 8 August 2013: Doro Pesch feat. Chris Boltendahl - "East Meets West" (live)
- 8 August 2013: Doro Pesch feat. Biff Byford - "Denim and Leather" (live)
- 8 August 2013: Doro Pesch feat. Uli Jon Roth - "Für immer" (live)
- 8 August 2013: Doro Pesch feat. Subway to Sally - "Metal Tango" (live)
- 8 August 2013: Doro Pesch feat. Phil Campbell - "Breaking the Law" (live)
- 24 October 2014: Liv Kristine feat. Doro Pesch - "Stronghold of Angels" (on Vervain)
- 17 December 2014: Angra feat. Doro Pesch - "Crushing Room" (on Secret Garden)
- 25 March 2016: Amon Amarth feat. Doro Pesch - "A Dream That Cannot Be" (on Jomsviking)
- 30 August 2021: Show-Ya feat. Dorothee Pesch - "Heavy Metal Feminity" (on Showdown)
- August 2023: Doro Pesch feat. Rob Halford - "Living After Midnight" on Conqueress - Forever Strong and Proud
- October 2023: Doro Pesch feat. Rob Halford - "Total Eclipse of the Heart" on Conqueress - Forever Strong and Proud
- 28 February 2025: Dirkschneider feat. Doro Pesch - "Winter Dreams" on Balls to the Wall Reloaded
- July 8, 2025: Feuerschwanz feat. Doro Pesch - "Valhalla" on the still unreleased Knightclub
