= Earth Shaker Rock =

Compilation album by Warlock & Doro
- Released: September 20, 1999
- Genres: Hard rock, heavy metal
- Length: 64:13
- Label: Connoisseur Collection

Warlock chronology
Rare Diamonds (1991)	Earth Shaker Rock (1999)

Doro chronology
Best Of (1998)	Earth Shaker Rock (1999)	Calling the Wild (2000)

Professional ratings
Review scores
Source	Rating
AllMusic	3/5 stars

Earth Shaker Rock is a compilation album, containing songs of the German heavy metal band Warlock and the last four songs coming from Warlock singer Doro Pesch's first two solo albums. It is the last album issued under the Warlock moniker and was released on CD in 1999 by the British label Connoisseur Collection, specialized in compilation albums of various recording artists.

== Track listing ==
No.	Title	Writer(s)	From the album	Length
1.	"Burning the Witches"	Rudy Graf	Burning the Witches (1984)	4:26
2.	"Metal Racer"	Graf	Burning the Witches	3:47
3.	"Hellbound"	Peter Szigeti, Henri Staroste, Doro Pesch, Frank Rittel, Michael Eurich, Graf	Hellbound (1985)	3:40
4.	"Earthshaker Rock"	Graf, Rittel, Pesch, Szigeti, Eurich	Hellbound	3:25
5.	"Time to Die"	Graf, Staroste, Pesch, Rittel, Szigeti, Eurich	Hellbound	4:29
6.	"Love in the Danger Zone"	Szigeti, Staroste, Pesch, René Maué	True as Steel (1986)	4:13
7.	"True as Steel"	Niko Arvanitis, Staroste, Pesch, Maué	True as Steel	3:30
8.	"All We Are"	Pesch, Joey Balin	Triumph and Agony (1987)	3:13
9.	"Three Minute Warning"	Pesch, Balin	Triumph and Agony	2:30
10.	"I Rule the Ruins"	Pesch, Balin	Triumph and Agony	4:01
11.	"Metal Tango"	Pesch, Arvanitis, Balin	Triumph and Agony	4:19
12.	"Für Immer('Forever')"	Pesch, Balin	Triumph and Agony	4:46
13.	"Hellraiser"	Pesch, Tommy Henriksen, Balin	Force Majeure (1989)	4:48
14.	"Angels with Dirty Faces"	Pesch, Balin	Force Majeure	3:58
15.	"Under the Gun"	Pesch, Jon Levin, Henriksen, Balin	Force Majeure	3:51
16.	"Something Wicked This Way Comes"	Gene Simmons	Doro (1990)	5:17
Total length:				64:13
