= Rare Diamonds =

1991 compilation album by Warlock and Doro

Compilation album by Warlock and Doro
- Released: March 1991
- Genre: Hard rock, heavy metal
- Length: 56:28
- Label: Vertigo

Warlock chronology
Triumph and Agony (1987)	Rare Diamonds (1991)	Earth Shaker Rock (1999)

Doro chronology
Doro (1990)	Rare Diamonds (1991)	True at Heart (1991)

Rare Diamonds

Video by Warlock and Doro
- Released: March 1991
- Genre: Hard rock, heavy metal
- Length: 24:02
- Label: Polygram Music Video

Warlock video chronology
The Videos (1989)	Rare Diamonds (1991)

Doro video chronology
Rare Diamonds (1991)	Doro Live '93 (1993)

Rare Diamonds is a compilation album, containing songs of the German heavy metal band Warlock and songs coming from Warlock singer Doro Pesch's first two solo albums. The album was released as LP in 1991 at the same time of a VHS with videos of the band and Doro's.

== Track listing ==
No.	Title	Writer(s)	Originally from	Length
1.	"All We Are"	Joey Balin, Doro Pesch	Triumph and Agony (1987)	3:19
2.	"Unholy Love"	Phil Brown, Adam Mitchell	Doro (1990)	4:42
3.	"Für Immer ('Forever')"	Balin, Pesch	Triumph and Agony	4:12
4.	"True as Steel"	Niko Arvanitis, Henri Staroste, Pesch, René Maué	True as Steel (1986)	3:20
5.	"Beyond the Trees"	Balin, Pesch	Force Majeure (1989)	2:27
6.	"East Meets West"	Balin, Pesch	live recording at The Marquee, New York City	3:40
7.	"Rare Diamond"	Pesch, Louis Lepore	live recording at The Lamour, New York City	3:30
8.	"You Hurt My Soul (On and On)"	Pesch, Staroste, Maué	Single (1985)	5:40
9.	"Hellbound"	Peter Szigeti, Staroste, Pesch, Frank Rittel, Michael Eurich, Rudy Graf	Hellbound (1985)	3:40
10.	"Burning the Witches"	Graf	Burning the Witches (1984)	4:24
11.	"Out of Control"	Graf, Staroste, Pesch, Maué, Rittel, Szigeti, Eurich	Hellbound	4:49
12.	"A Whiter Shade of Pale" (Procol Harum cover)	Gary Brooker, Keith Reid	Force Majeure	3:56
13.	"Without You"	Pesch, Szigeti	Burning the Witches	5:34
14.	"Love Song"	Staroste, Pesch, Maué	True as Steel	3:45

== VHS track listing ==
1. "Rare Diamond" – 3:23
2. "Unholy Love" – 2:39
3. "A Whiter Shade of Pale" – 2:56
4. "Hard Times" – 3:25
5. "Für Immer" – 4:52
6. "All We Are" – 3:19
7. "Fight for Rock" – 3:28

== Charts ==
Chart (1991)	Peak position
German Albums (Offizielle Top 100)	37
Swiss Albums (Schweizer Hitparade)	33
