= Doro Live =

Live album by Doro
- Released: 1 November 1993
- Recorded: "Angels Never Die - Tour '93" in Germany
- Genre: Heavy metal
- Length: 69:31
- Label: Vertigo
- Producer: Keith Bessey

Doro chronology
Angels Never Die (1993)	Doro Live (1993)	Machine II Machine (1995)

Doro Live '93

Video by Doro
- Released: 1993
- Genre: Heavy metal
- Length: 90:27
- Label: Polygram
- Director: Michael Souvigner
- Producer: Keith Bessey

Doro video chronology
Rare Diamonds (1991)	Doro Live '93 (1993)	Für Immer (2003)

Doro Live was the first official live album by German hard rock singer Doro Pesch, recorded during the Angels Never Die tour in Germany and released by Vertigo in 1993. The VHS Doro Live '93 was released at the same time only in Europe. It was filmed during two concerts in Germany on 6 and 7 October 1993 and contains two more songs: "The Fortuneteller" and "East Meets West".

== Track listing ==
No.	Title	Writer(s)	Length
1.	"I Rule the Ruins"	Doro Pesch, Joey Balin	4:09
2.	"Hellbound"	Peter Szigeti, Henri Staroste, Pesch, Frank Rittel, Michael Eurich, Rudy Graf	2:42
3.	"Only You"	Gene Simmons	4:31
4.	"Bad Blood"	Pesch, Jack Ponti, Vic Pepe	4:13
5.	"So Alone Together"	Pesch, Gary Scruggs	5:24
6.	"Fall for Me Again"	Pesch, Scruggs	4:24
7.	"Für Immer" ("Forever")	Pesch, Balin	6:02
8.	"Metal Tango"	Pesch, Balin	4:03
9.	"Let's Rock Forever" (previously unreleased)	Pesch, Scruggs	2:20
10.	"Eye on You"	Pesch, Ponti, Pepe	2:56
11.	"All We Are"	Pesch, Balin	5:22
12.	"Enough for You"	Pesch, Ponti, Pepe	4:57
13.	"I Am What I Am"	Pesch, Balin, Tommy Henriksen	2:43
14.	"Whenever I Think of You" (previously unreleased)	Pesch, Scruggs	4:24
15.	"Children of the Night" (previously unreleased)	Pesch, Scruggs	4:04
16.	"Burning the Witches"	Graf	3:29
17.	"Alles ist Gut" ("Everything is Good")	Pesch, Staroste, W. Plass	3:48
Total length:			69:31

== Credits ==
- Doro Pesch – vocals
- Joe Taylor – lead electric and acoustic guitars, backing vocals
- Jimmy DiLella – electric and acoustic guitars, keyboards, backing vocals
- Nick Douglas – bass, keyboards, backing vocals
- Johnny Dee – drums

== Charts ==
Chart (1993–2026)	Peak position
German Albums (Offizielle Top 100)	37
German Rock & Metal Albums (Offizielle Top 100)	11
