= Metal Racer =

- Original VHS cover

Video by Warlock
- Released: 1985
- Recorded: Camden Palace Theatre, London, 24 September 1985
- Genre: Heavy metal
- Length: 55:00
- Label: Hendring /Castle
- Director: Madeleine French
- Producer: Phillip Goodhand-Tait

Warlock chronology
Metal Racer (1985)	The Videos (1989)

DVD collectors edition cover

Professional ratings
Review scores
Source	Rating
AllMusic	3/5 stars

Metal Racer is the first video album released by German heavy metal band Warlock in 1986. The VHS contains live footage of a concert played at Camden Palace Theatre in London on 24 September 1985, during the European tour promoting the studio album Hellbound. The VHS was published in the USA through PolyGram Video. Starting from 2001, the video was re-issued by various publishers in DVD format under different titles and often with the title Doro Pesch and Warlock: Live. A special collectors edition includes also the soundtrack of the live video on CD.

== Track listing ==
1. "Out of Control"
2. "Earthshaker Rock"
3. "Metal Racer"
4. "Wrathchild"
5. "Hellbound"
6. "Holding Me"
7. "Shout It Out"
8. "Evil"
9. "Without You"
10. "Hateful Guy"
11. "All Night"
12. "Burning the Witches"
13. "Time to Die"

== Personnel ==
=== Band members ===
- Doro Pesch – vocals
- Rudy Graf – guitar
- Peter Szigeti – guitar
- Frank Rittel – bass guitar
- Michael Eurich – drums

== Production ==
- Madeleine French – director
- Phillip Goodhand-Tait – producer
