= True as Steel =

True as Steel may refer to:

- True as Steel (album), a 1986 album by Warlock
- True as Steel (film), a 1924 drama film directed and written by Rupert Hughes
