= True at Heart =

Studio album by Doro
- Released: 4 August 1991
- Recorded: 1991
- Studios: Digital Recorders, Nashville, Tennessee, USA
- Genre: Hard rock
- Length: 51:43
- Label: Vertigo
- Producer: Barry Beckett

Doro chronology
Rare Diamonds (1991)	True at Heart (1991)	Angels Never Die (1993)

Singles from True at Heart
- 1. "Cool Love / Live It" Released: 1991; 2. "Fall for Me Again / Cool Love / Gettin' Nowhere Without You" Released: 1991; 3. "I'll Make It on My Own / Beyond the Trees / You Gonna Break My Heart" Released: 1993

Professional ratings
Review scores
Source	Rating
AllMusic	3/5 stars
Metal Hammer (GER)	2/7 stars
Rock Realms	3/7 stars

True at Heart is the third solo album of the German female hard rock singer Doro Pesch. It was recorded in Nashville, Tennessee and released in August 1991.

The third studio album of the former Warlock singer Doro Pesch is another exploration in new musical territory. Barry Beckett, a famous and seasoned mainstream music producer, was chosen to produce the album and a large number of authors and musicians living and working in Nashville, the recording haven of country music, participated in the recording sessions. The result is an album with many ballads, few uptempo songs and a pronounced blues influence.

The working of this album marks the beginning of the collaboration between Doro Pesch and Nashville guitarist Gary Scruggs.

== Track listing ==
No.	Title	Writer(s)	Length
1.	"Cool Love"	Doro Pesch, Todd Cerney, Bob DiPiero	3:45
2.	"You Gonna Break My Heart"	Pesch, Dennis Morgan	3:42
3.	"Even Angels Cry"	Pesch, Gary Scruggs	4:47
4.	"The Fortuneteller"	Pesch, Scruggs	5:15
5.	"Live It"	Pesch, Morgan	4:12
6.	"Fall for Me Again"	Pesch, Scruggs	4:12
7.	"Heartshaped Tattoo"	Pesch, Cerney, DiPiero	3:44
8.	"With the Wave of Your Hand"	Pesch, Cerney, DiPiero	4:52
9.	"Hear Me"	Pesch, Morgan	3:44
10.	"I'll Make It on My Own"	Pesch, Vince Melamed	4:07
11.	"Gettin' Nowhere Without You"	Pesch, Scruggs	4:20
12.	"I Know You by Heart"	Pesch, Morgan	5:03
Total length:			51:43

== Personnel ==
Musicians

- Doro Pesch – vocals
- Michael Thompson, Dann Huff – lead guitars
- Kenny Greenberg, Gordon Kennedy, Dennis Morgan, Don Potter – guitars
- Mike Lawler – keyboards
- Barry Beckett – piano, producer
- Leland Sklar – bass
- Eddie Bayers – drums
- Jim Horn – alto saxophone
- Todd Cerney, Bob DiPiero, Chris Eddy, Robert White Johnson, Tony Seals, Troy Seals – backing vocals

Production

- Jeff Balding, Jim DeMain – engineers, mixing
- Doug Sax – mastering
- Ragena Warden – production coordinator

== Charts ==
Chart (1991)	Peak position
German Albums (Offizielle Top 100)	19
Swiss Albums (Schweizer Hitparade)	26
