= Warrior Soul (album) =

- Cover art by Geoffrey Gillespie

Studio album by Doro
- Released: 24 March 2006
- Recorded: April 2005 – January 2006
- Studios: Atom H Studios, Düsseldorf, Germany; Foolpark Studios, Lucerne, Switzerland; Yellohouse Studio, Wuppertal, Germany
- Genre: Heavy metal
- Length: 54:12
- Label: AFM
- Producers: Chris Lietz, Torsten Sickert, Doro Pesch, Luke Gasser, Deezl Imhof

Doro chronology
In Liebe und Freundschaft (2005)	Warrior Soul (2006)	All We Are – The Fight (2007)

Winter edition cover

Professional ratings
Review scores
Source	Rating
AllMusic	3.5/5 stars
Blabbermouth.net	7.5/10 stars
Metal Hammer (GER)	6/7 stars

Warrior Soul is the tenth studio album of the German female hard rock singer Doro Pesch. It was released worldwide in 2006 by AFM Records.

The recording of the album took a prolonged time, due to singer Doro Pesch filming the movie Anuk – Der Weg des Kriegers, starring as 'Meha'. The film was shot in Switzerland in 2005 and directed by Luke Gasser. The song "Warrior Soul" is included in the movie soundtrack and Gasser is credited as co-producer of the album, which was partially recorded in Switzerland with session musicians.

The album was published also as an enhanced CD with different bonus tracks and multimedia sections. It was also published in a boxed Winter edition, containing a bonus disc of unreleased and live tracks and other gadgets.

The album reached position No. 27 on the German Longplay chart.

== Track listing ==
No.	Title	Writer(s)	Length
1.	"You're My Family"	Doro Pesch, Anke Mörsch	4:14
2.	"Haunted Heart"	Pesch, Gary Scruggs	5:14
3.	"Strangers Yesterday"	Pesch, Joe Taylor	4:49
4.	"Thunderspell"	Pesch, Chris Lietz	4:39
5.	"Warrior Soul"	Pesch, Scruggs	4:44
6.	"Heaven I See"	Pesch, Scruggs	4:37
7.	"Creep into My Brain"	Pesch, Taylor, Johnny Dee, Nick Douglas, Oliver Palotai	3:56
8.	"Above the Ashes"	Pesch, Scruggs	4:16
9.	"My Majesty"	Pesch, Torsten Sickert, Klaus Vanscheidt	4:06
10.	"In Liebe und Freundschaft" ("For Love and Friendship")	Pesch, Lietz	3:35
11.	"Ungebrochen ('Unbroken')"	Pesch, Lietz	1:39
12.	"Shine On"	Pesch, Taylor	8:23
Total length:			54:12

Digibook edition bonus tracks
No.	Title	Writer(s)	Length
13.	"Angel in the Dark"	Pesch, Scruggs	4:14
14.	"1999"	Pesch, Scruggs	4:00

Japanese edition bonus tracks
No.	Title	Writer(s)	Length
13.	"For Love and Friendship"	Pesch, Lietz	3:40
14.	"Lonely Wolf"	Pesch, Scruggs	4:04

Winter edition bonus disc
No.	Title	Writer(s)	Length
1.	"Everything's Lost" (previously unreleased)	Pesch, Scruggs	3:53
2.	"You're My Family" (live)		4:23
3.	"My Majesty" (live)		4:36
4.	"Above the Ashes" (live)		4:33
5.	"Für Immer ('Forever')" (live)	Pesch, Joey Balin	7:15

- Digibook edition has a multimedia section.

== Personnel ==
=== Band members ===
- Doro Pesch – vocals
- Nick Douglas – bass, keyboards, backing vocals
- Joe Taylor – guitars, backing vocals
- Johnny Dee – drums, backing vocals
- Oliver Palotai – keyboards, guitars, backing vocals

=== Additional musicians ===
- Steve 'Hef' Häflinger – guitars
- Oli Häller – drums
- Tim Husung – drums
- Thomi Imhof – bass
- Chris Lietz – guitars, keyboards
- Torsten Sickert – guitars, keyboards, bass
- Klaus Vanscheidt – guitars

=== Production ===
- Luke Gasser – associate producer on tracks 2, 3, 5, 6, 8
- Deezl Imhof – associate producer, engineer, mixing on tracks 2, 3, 5, 6, 8,
- Chris Lietz – producer, engineer, mixing
- Doro Pesch – producer
- Torsten Sickert – producer

== Charts ==
Chart (2006)	Peak position
German Albums (Offizielle Top 100)	27
