= In Liebe und Freundschaft =

EP by Doro
- Released: 11 November 2005
- Recorded: Yellohouse Studio, Wuppertal, Germany
- Genre: Heavy metal
- Length: 14:53
- Label: AFM
- Producer: Chris Lietz, Torsten Sickert

Doro chronology
Classic Diamonds (2004)	In Liebe und Freundschaft (2005)	Warrior Soul (2006)

Professional ratings
Review scores
Source	Rating
Metal Hammer (GER)	5/7 stars

In Liebe und Freundschaft is an EP by German hard rock singer Doro Pesch, released in 2005 by AFM Records. It is an enhanced CD containing both musical tracks and a live video. The title is German for "For Love and Friendship". The EP was released to launch the upcoming album Warrior Soul and reached position No. 92 in the German singles chart.

== Track listing ==
No.	Title	Writer(s)	Length
1.	"In Liebe und Freundschaft"	Doro Pesch, Chris Lietz	3:38
2.	"For Love and Friendship" (English version)	Pesch, Lietz	3:39
3.	"Lonely Wolf"	Pesch, Gary Scruggs	3:59
4.	"Never Get Out of This Alive"	Pesch, Scruggs	3:37

Bonus

- "All We Are" (live video from Bang Your Head Festival 2005)

== Personnel ==
=== Band members ===
- Doro Pesch – vocals, producer
- Nick Douglas – bass, keyboards, backing vocals
- Joe Taylor – guitars, backing vocals
- Johnny Dee – drums, backing vocals
- Oliver Palotai – keyboards, guitars, backing vocals

=== Additional musicians ===
- Chris Caffery – guitars
- Klaus Vanscheidt – guitars
- Dirk Wichterich – guitars
- Chris Lietz – guitars, keyboards, producer, engineer, mixing
- Torsten Sickert – keyboards, producer

== Charts ==
Chart (2005)	Peak position
Germany (GfK)	92
