= We're Like Thunder =

Single by Doro featuring Regina Halmich
- Released: 12 September 2005
- Recorded: Yellohouse Studio, Wuppertal, Germany, 2005
- Length: 12:06
- Label: AFM
- Songwriters: Doro Pesch, Nick Douglas, Chris Lietz
- Producers: Torsten Sickert, Chris Lietz

Doro singles chronology
"Für Immer" (2003)	"We're Like Thunder" (2005)	"Tief in Meinem Herzen – Borussia Dortmund" (2006)

"We're Like Thunder" is a CD single released by German hard rock singer Doro Pesch in 2005. The vocals of German female boxing champion Regina Halmich, recorded at the House of Audio studios in Karlsdorf, Germany, are featured in the song "We're Like Thunder" in a duet with Pesch. The song "She's Like Thunder" was written by Doro Pesch for her friend Regina Halmich, to be used as an official anthem before her performances. A symphonic version of it is present as a bonus track in the album Classic Diamonds, released in 2004.

== Track listing ==
Music and lyrics by Doro Pesch, Nick Douglas and Chris Lietz

1. "We're Like Thunder" - 3:09
2. "She's Like Thunder" (new version 2005) - 3:08
3. "She's Like Thunder" (official fight hymn) - 2:01
4. "She's Like Thunder" (Classic Diamonds mix) - 3:48

== Credits ==
- Doro Pesch - vocals
- Regina Halmich - vocals
- Nick Douglas - bass
- Klaus Vanscheidt - guitars
- Johnny Dee - drums
- Torsten Sickert - keyboards, producer
- Chris Lietz - producer, mixing
