= All We Are =

Single by Warlock

from the album Triumph and Agony
- Released: 1987
- Genre: Heavy metal, power metal
- Length: 5:49, 11:23
- Label: Vertigo
- Songwriters: Doro Pesch, Joey Balin
- Producer: Joey Balin

Warlock singles chronology
"You Hurt My Soul (On and On)" (1986)	"All We Are" (1987)	"East Meets West" (1987)

"All We Are" is a song composed by the German heavy metal band Warlock, from their 1987 album Triumph and Agony. It was released as the band's fourth single and published by Vertigo Records. A music video for the song was shot by director Mark Rezyka in the Los Angeles river basin and was on heavy rotation on MTV's heavy metal program Headbangers Ball. The song was published again in every compilation of Warlock songs and is a staple of Doro's live shows to this day.

== Track listings ==
7"

1. "All We Are" – 3:19
2. "Three Minutes Warning" – 2:30

12"

1. "All We Are" – 3:19
2. "I Rule the Ruins" – 4:03
3. "Cold, Cold World" – 4:01

== Warlock line-up ==
- Doro Pesch – vocals
- Niko Arvanitis – guitar
- Tommy Bolan – guitar
- Tommy Henriksen – bass
- Michael Eurich – drums

== All We Are – The Fight ==
All We Are – The Fight

EP by Doro
- Released: 25 May 2007
- Recorded: Atom H Studios, Düsseldorf, Germany; Foolpark Studios, Lucerne, Switzerland; Yellohouse Studio, Wuppertal, Germany
- Genre: Heavy metal
- Length: 22:30
- Label: AFM
- Producers: Chris Lietz, Torsten Sickert, Tobi Gmür, Luke Gasser, Deezl Imhof

Doro chronology
Warrior Soul (2006)	All We Are – The Fight (2007)	Metal Queen – B-Sides & Rarities (2007)

All We Are – The Fight is an EP by German hard rock singer Doro Pesch, released in 2007 by AFM Records. It is an enhanced CD containing both musical tracks and live videos and videoclips. The title track was released as a single by Doro's former band Warlock in 1987.

The EP shows the subtitle A Tribute to Regina Halmich, because this version of the title track "All We Are" was originally performed on 30 March 2006 on German TV as the entrance song for Doro's best friend, German boxing champion Regina Halmich. The musicians who performed the song live, Destruction leader Schmier, After Forever guitarist Bas Maas and drummer Tim Hsung, later recorded this new version in studio for this EP. Other songs of the EP come from the recording sessions for the album Warrior Soul, while the duet with Krokus singer Marc Storace comes from the soundtrack of the movie Anuk – Der Weg des Kriegers and also features the director and main star of the movie Luke Gasser on guitar and production.

The song "Babe I'm Gonna Leave You" is a cover of the 1969 Led Zeppelin single from the album Led Zeppelin.

== Track listing ==
1. "All We Are" (2007 version) (Doro Pesch, Joey Balin) – 3:02
2. "Thunderspell" (D. Pesch, Chris Lietz) – 4:39
3. "Everything's Lost" (D. Pesch, Gary Scruggs) – 3:52
4. "On My Own" (Luke Gasser, Marc Storace) – 3:41
5. "Babe I'm Gonna Leave You" (Anne Bredon, Jimmy Page, Robert Plant) – 7:11

=== Video tracks listing ===
1. "All We Are" (live 2006) – 7:31
2. "Above the Ashes" – 4:16
3. "Warrior Soul" – 2:44
4. "You're My Family" (live at Sweden Rock Festival) – 3:54
5. "On My Own" – 3:41

== Personnel ==
=== Band members ===
- Doro Pesch – vocals
- Nick Douglas – bass, keyboards, backing vocals
- Joe Taylor – guitars, backing vocals
- Johnny Dee – drums, backing vocals
- Oliver Palotai – keyboards, guitars, backing vocals

=== Additional musicians ===
- Schmier – bass, vocals on track 1
- Bas Maas – guitars on track 1
- Marc Storace – vocals on track 5
- Klaus Vanscheidt – guitars
- Steve 'Hef' Häflinger – guitars
- Oli Häller – drums
- Tim Husung – drums on track 1
- Thomi Imhof – bass
- Chris Lietz – guitars, keyboards, producer, engineer, mixing
- Torsten Sickert: guitars, keyboards, bass, producer
- Luke Gasser – guitar and associate producer on track 5

=== Production ===
- Deezl Imhof – associate producer, engineer, mixing
- Tobi Gmür – associate producer on track 5

=== Video production ===
- Ronald Mattes (Roaxfilms.de) – tracks 1 and 2
- SwedenRock team – track 4
- Reinhard Steiner, Luke Gasser – tracks 3 and 5
