= Doro (album) =

Studio album by Doro
- Released: 25 September 1990
- Studios: Fortress Recorders, Hollywood, California, US
- Genres: Hard rock, heavy metal
- Length: 43:38
- Label: Vertigo
- Producers: Tommy Thayer, Pat Regan, Gene Simmons

Doro chronology
Force Majeure (1989)	Doro (1990)	Rare Diamonds (1991)

Singles from Doro
- 1. "Unholy Love / Broken" Released: 1990

Professional ratings
Review scores
Source	Rating
AllMusic	3/5 stars
Metal Hammer (GER)	4/7 stars
Rock Realms	4/7 stars
Select	2/5 stars

Doro is the second solo album of the German female hard rock singer Doro Pesch. The album was released on 25 September 1990.

== Overview ==
Doro's second album is more a solo effort than a band production. In fact, the German singer chose for herself a new musical direction, consciously separating the music creative process from normal band dynamics, the contrary of what she had always done in the past with Warlock. The album production was put in the hands of Kiss bassist Gene Simmons, Doro's childhood idol. Simmons provided five songs, including the covers of The Electric Prunes' 60s psychedelic hit "I Had Too Much to Dream" and of Black 'n Blue's "Rock On", and musicians coming from the Kiss' entourage to complete the recording. The song "Only You" is a Kiss cover from the album Music from "The Elder" (1981). He gave his protégé Tommy Thayer from the band Black 'n Blue (another band Simmons produced) a chance to shine as co-producer of the album, along with Pat Regan. "I'll Be Holding On" is a cover of a Gregg Allman song from the 1989 film Black Rain.

The resulting sound is much smoother and polished than any Warlock album, in the vein of many American glam metal recordings of the time, and the lyrics give up completely the gothic atmosphere present in the offerings of Doro Pesch's previous band. The many photos on the cover and inner sleeve were taken by famous Playboy and fashion photographer Phillip Dixon. Despite the commercial appeal of the music and the high economic effort in producing it, the album did not have the critical and sales success that was expected and remained the last studio album by Doro published in the United States for ten years.

== Track listing ==
Side one
No.	Title	Writer(s)	Length
1.	"Unholy Love"	Phil Brown, Adam Mitchell	4:42
2.	"I Had Too Much to Dream" (The Electric Prunes cover)	Nancie Mantz, Annette Tucker	4:04
3.	"Rock On" (Black 'n Blue cover)	Tommy Thayer, Jaime St. James, Gene Simmons	3:18
4.	"Only You" (Kiss cover)	Simmons	4:21
5.	"I'll Be Holding On"	Will Jennings, Hans Zimmer	5:22

Side two
No.	Title	Writer(s)	Length
6.	"Something Wicked This Way Comes"	Simmons	5:15
7.	"Rare Diamond"	Doro Pesch, Louis Lepore	3:35
8.	"Broken"	Pesch, Karen Childs	4:46
9.	"Alive"	Pesch, Childs	4:14
10.	"Mirage"	Simmons	4:01

== Personnel ==
Musicians

- Doro Pesch – vocals
- Tommy Thayer – lead, rhythm and acoustic guitars, producer
- Lanny Cordola – lead guitar
- Pat Regan – keyboards, producer, engineer, mixing
- Karen Childs, Paul Morris – keyboards
- E. J. Curse, Todd Jensen, Chuck Wright – bass
- Tommy Amato, Chris Frazier, Kevin Valentine – drums

Production

- Gene Simmons – executive producer
- Greg Calbi – mastering

== Charts ==
Chart (1990)	Peak position
German Albums (Offizielle Top 100)	9
Swiss Albums (Schweizer Hitparade)	22
