= Anthems for the Champion – The Queen =

EP by Doro
- Released: 30 November 2007
- Genre: Heavy metal
- Length: 19:51
- Label: AFM
- Producer: Chris Lietz, Torsten Sickert, Doro Pesch, Don Malsch

Doro chronology
Metal Queen – B-Sides & Rarities (2007)	Anthems for the Champion – The Queen (2007)	Celebrate – The Night of the Warlock (2008)

Anthems for the Champion – The Queen is an EP by German female hard rock singer Doro Pesch, released in 2007 through AFM Records. The EP collects all the anthems composed by Doro and used to introduce the performances of her good friend, the German female boxing champion Regina Halmich. The only previously unreleased song is "The Queen", which Halmich used as an anthem for her final year of agonistic activity.

The EP reached position No. 89 in the German single chart.

== Track listing ==
1. "The Queen" (Chris Lietz, Doro Pesch) – 3:38
2. "She's Like Thunder" (Original Fight Hymn) (Nick Douglas, Lietz, Pesch) – 2:06
3. "We're Like Thunder" (feat. Regina Halmich) (Douglas, Lietz, Pesch) – 3:11
4. "All We Are" (2007 Version) (Joey Balin, Pesch) – 3:04
5. "Fight" (Joe Taylor, Douglas, Pesch, Johnny Dee) – 4:11
6. "The Queen" (Acoustic Radio mix) (Lietz, Pesch) – 3:41

== Personnel ==
- Doro Pesch – vocals, producer, design
- Nick Douglas – bass, backing vocals
- Johnny Dee – drums, backing vocals
- Oliver Palotai – keyboards, backing vocals
- Chris Lietz – guitar, keyboards, programming, producer, engineer, mixing
- Regina Halmich – vocals on track 3
- Klaus Vanscheidt – guitars on tracks 2 and 3
- Torsten Sickert – keyboards, producer track 2 and 3
- Schmier – bass, vocals on track 4
- Bas Maas – guitars on track 4
- Tim Husung – drums on track 4
- Joe Taylor – guitars on track 5
- Don Malsch – producer, engineer, mixing track 5
- Thomas Ewerhard – design

== Charts ==
Chart (2007)	Peak position
Germany (GfK)	89
