= Triumph and Agony =

- Cover art by Geoffrey Gillespie

Studio album by Warlock
- Released: 29 September 1987
- Studios: Power Station, New York City; Kajem Recording, Philadelphia
- Genre: Heavy metal
- Length: 39:14
- Languages: English, German
- Labels: Vertigo (Europe), Mercury (US)
- Producer: Joey Balin

Warlock chronology
True as Steel (1986)	Triumph and Agony (1987)	Rare Diamonds (1991)

Singles from Triumph and Agony
- 1. "All We Are" / "Three Minutes Warning" Released: 1 September 1987; 2. "East Meets West" / "I Rule the Ruins" Released: 1987; 3. "Für immer" / "Metal Tango" Released: 1987

Professional ratings
Review scores
Source	Rating
AllMusic	4/5 stars
Blogcritics	5/5 stars
Collector's Guide to Heavy Metal	8/10
Rock Realms	4/7 stars

Triumph and Agony is the fourth and final studio album by the German heavy metal band Warlock, released on 29 September 1987.

The album was recorded in the US with producer Joey Balin and a different band line-up in comparison with the previous album True as Steel, which had made the name of Warlock known outside of Europe. Peter Szigeti and Frank Rittel were replaced in 1987 by the American musicians Tommy Bolan and Tommy Henriksen respectively. The album also features British drummer Cozy Powell on one track.

The song "All We Are" received some airplay on American metal radio stations and its video clip shot by director Mark Rezyka had good rotation on MTV's Headbangers Ball. Many songs of this album are still performed live by Doro's band.

== Track listing ==
All tracks are written by Doro Pesch and Joey Balin, except where noted.

Side one
No.	Title	Length
1.	"All We Are"	3:19
2.	"Three Minute Warning"	2:30
3.	"I Rule the Ruins"	4:03
4.	"Kiss of Death" (Pesch, Niko Arvanitis, Balin)	4:08
5.	"Make Time for Love"	4:45

Side two
No.	Title	Length
6.	"East Meets West"	3:34
7.	"Touch of Evil"	4:18
8.	"Metal Tango" (Pesch, Arvanitis, Balin)	4:24
9.	"Cold, Cold World" (Pesch, Arvanitis, Balin)	4:01
10.	"Für Immer ('Forever')"	4:12

2011 CD edition bonus tracks
No.	Title	Length
11.	"East Meets West" (live)	3:45
12.	"Angels with Dirty Faces"	3:58
13.	"Under the Gun" (Pesch, Jon Levin, Tommy Henriksen, Balin)	3:51
14.	"Something Wicked This Way Comes" (Gene Simmons)	5:17

== Personnel ==
=== Band members ===
- Doro Pesch – vocals
- Niko Arvanitis – guitar
- Tommy Bolan – guitar
- Tommy Henriksen – bass
- Michael Eurich – drums

Additional musicians

- Cozy Powell – guest drummer on "Touch of Evil"
- Rudy Richman – guest drummer
- Sterling Campbell – guest drummer

Production

- Joey Balin – producer, arrangements
- Brooke Hendricks, Mr. Mitch – mixing
- Steve Rinkoff, Larry Alexander – engineers
- Roy Hendrickson – assistant engineer
- Greg Calbi – mastering at Sterling Sound
- Geoffrey Gillespie – illustration
- Peter Zimmermann – management

== Charts ==
Chart (1988)	Peak position
Finnish Albums (The Official Finnish Charts)	25
German Albums (Offizielle Top 100)	23
Swiss Albums (Schweizer Hitparade)	30
UK Albums (Official Charts)	54
US Billboard 200	80

== Sales and certifications ==
Certifications for Triumph and Agony
Region	Certification	Certified units/sales
Germany (BVMI)	Gold	250,000^{^}
^{^} Shipments figures based on certification alone.
