= Force Majeure (Doro album) =

Studio album by Doro
- Released: 1 February 1989
- Studios: Kajem Recordings, Victory Studios, Gladwyne, Pennsylvania; Right Track Recording, New York City
- Genres: Hard rock; heavy metal
- Length: 46:05
- Label: Vertigo
- Producer: Joey Balin

Doro chronology
Force Majeure (1989)	Doro (1990)

Singles from Force Majeure
- 1. "A Whiter Shade of Pale / Angels with Dirty Faces" Released: 1989; 2. "Hard Times / Für Immer (live)" Released: 1989

Professional ratings
Review scores
Source	Rating
AllMusic	4/5 stars
Hi-Fi News & Record Review	A:1/2
Metal Hammer (GER)	4/7
Rock Hard	7.0/10
Rock Realms	5/7 stars

Force Majeure is the debut solo studio album by German singer Doro, released in February 1989 by Vertigo Records.

== Background ==
Following the success of Warlock's album Triumph and Agony, which achieved Gold status in Germany and reached number 98 on the Billboard 200 in the United States, Doro Pesch remained the sole original member of the band. Legal disputes regarding the use of the band’s name were subsequently raised by the former manager, and Doro ultimately resolved the matter by relinquishing the right to release new material under the name "Warlock", instead issuing future works under her own name. Nevertheless, the initial pressing of the LP featured a sticker on the cover, adjacent to Doro’s name, bearing the inscription "+ Warlock", and, for some fans, Force Majeure is still regarded as the band’s final album.

As with Triumph and Agony, the album was recorded in the United States and produced by Joey Balin. Bassist Tommy Henriksen, a member of Warlock’s final line-up, also performed on this record. The line-up was completed by drummer Bobby Rondinelli—known for his work with Rainbow, Scorpions, Quiet Riot, Black Sabbath, and Blue Öyster Cult—and guitarist Jon Levin, whose name was erroneously printed as "Jon Devin" on the album sleeve.

In an effort to build upon the favourable reception of the previous Warlock release in the American market, the songs on Force Majeure adopt a more radio-friendly glam metal style, diverging from the power metal influences characteristic of Doro’s earlier European work. The album also includes, for the first time, a cover version: "A Whiter Shade of Pale" by Procol Harum. While the album performed well in Europe, its success in the United States was more limited, peaking at number 154 on the Billboard 200.

== Critical reception ==
Billboard reviewer described the music of this work as "metal rock with Pesch's intriguing voice surrounded by screaming guitars and pounding drums" and expressed an opinion that she could gain a lot of new fans with a little help from MTV and a good spot on a tour.

== Track listing ==
Side one
No.	Title	Writer(s)	Length
1.	"A Whiter Shade of Pale" (Procol Harum cover)	Gary Brooker, Keith Reid	3:49
2.	"Save My Soul"	Joey Balin, Doro Pesch	3:47
3.	"World Gone Wild"	Balin, Pesch	3:54
4.	"Mission of Mercy"	Balin, Pesch	3:57
5.	"Angels with Dirty Faces"	Balin, Pesch	3:59
6.	"Beyond the Trees"	Balin, Pesch	2:28

Side two
No.	Title	Writer(s)	Length
7.	"Hard Times"	Balin, Pesch	3:32
8.	"Hellraiser"	Balin, Tommy Henriksen, Pesch	4:57
9.	"I Am What I Am"	Balin, Henriksen, Pesch	2:35
10.	"Cry Wolf"	Balin, Henriksen, Pesch	4:47
11.	"Under the Gun"	Balin, Jon Levin, Henriksen, Pesch	3:49
12.	"River of Tears"	Balin, Henriksen, Pesch	3:55
13.	"Bis aufs Blut" ("To the Death")	Pesch	0:36

== Personnel ==
Band members

- Doro Pesch – vocals
- Jon Levin – guitars
- Tommy Henriksen – bass, backing vocals
- Bobby Rondinelli – drums

Additional musicians

- Claude Schnell – keyboards

Production

- Joey Balin – producer, all arrangements
- Jeff Hendrickson – engineer, mixing
- Dominick Maita – engineer
- Brooke Hendricks, Brian Stover, Michael White – assistant engineers
- Greg Calbi – mastering

== Charts ==
=== Weekly charts ===
Weekly chart performance for Force Majeure
Chart (1989)	Peak position
European Albums (Music & Media)	20
German Albums (Offizielle Top 100)	5
Swiss Albums (Schweizer Hitparade)	12
US Billboard 200	154

=== Year-end charts ===
Year-end chart performance for Force Majeure
Chart (1989)	Position
German Albums (Offizielle Top 100)	60

== Certifications ==
Region	Certification	Certified units/sales
Germany (BVMI)	Gold	250,000^{‡}
^{‡} Sales+streaming figures based on certification alone.
