= Doro Pesch =

German singer (born 1964)

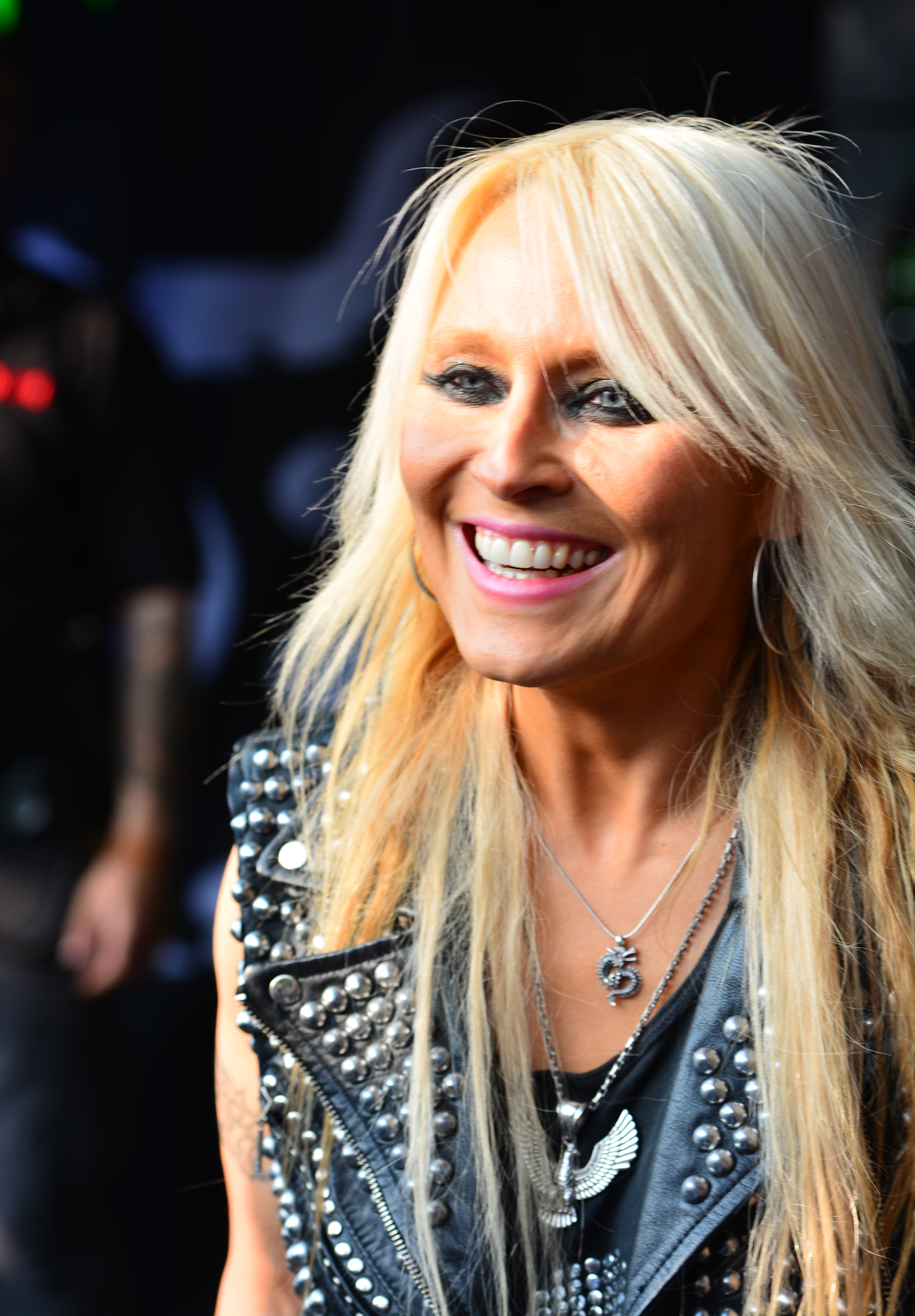
- Doro Pesch at Wacken Open Air 2014

Background information
- Also known as: "Metal Queen"
- Born: Dorothee Pesch; 3 June 1964 (age 62); Düsseldorf, West Germany
- Genre: Heavy metal
- Occupations: Singer; songwriter
- Works: Discography
- Years active: 1980–present
- Labels: Vertigo; PolyGram; WEA; SPV/Steamhammer; AFM; Nuclear Blast
- Formerly of: Snakebite; Warlock
- Website: doromusic.de

Dorothee Pesch (born 3 June 1964), known professionally as Doro Pesch or simply Doro, is a German heavy metal singer and the former frontwoman of heavy metal band Warlock. Doro's contributions to music and culture made her a global figure in metal culture for over four decades. The name Doro has also been associated with the touring band accompanying the singer, whose members have continuously changed in more than 20 years of uninterrupted activity, the most stable presences being those of bassist Nick Douglas and drummer Johnny Dee.

Doro started her career in garage bands in native Düsseldorf underground scene and achieved media visibility and some commercial success with Warlock in the 1980s. Warlock were starting to have an opening in the US market, when they went through many line-up changes and Pesch was left the only original member of the band. She started a solo career under the name Doro, in order to avoid legal battles between her record label PolyGram and her former manager. She released two albums in the US with producers Joey Balin and Gene Simmons, but they were not the breakthrough that she had hoped.

During the rise of grunge and alternative rock in the 1990s, her record label relegated her productions only to the European region, where she continued to tour extensively. She remained a successful charting artist in Germany, despite living and producing her albums in the US. When classic heavy metal found again the favour of the public, she returned to tour around the world and her popularity as a veteran singer grew considerably, inspiring many new female metal artists. Doro is also known for her duets performed both live and in studio with other singers and musicians of the metal scene, whom she has befriended in her long-term career, and was the first heavy metal artist to perform a drive-in concert during the COVID-19 pandemic.

To date, she has released 14 studio albums, the latest being Conqueress – Forever Strong and Proud in October 2023. Doro continues her recording career and is a regular touring artist all over the world.

== Biography ==
=== Beginnings ===
Dorothee Pesch was born in Düsseldorf, West Germany on 3 June 1964, as the only child of Walter, a truck driver, and Barbara Pesch. Doro's first memory of rock music is the song "Lucille" by Little Richard, which she sang when she was three years old. She learned to play piano and started singing at the age of ten years, when she was exposed to the glam rock of bands like T. Rex, the Sweet and Slade. When she was sixteen and after a life-threatening form of tuberculosis, she decided to dedicate more of her time and energy to singing, without giving up her study of graphic design. In 1980, she was accepted in her first band called Snakebite, which was playing rock music in a Düsseldorf basement used as rehearsal space by many other underground groups. The first recording with Doro on vocals was a cheap 7-track demo released by Snakebite for promotion. When Snakebite disbanded in 1981, Doro went on to sing for the garage bands Beast and Attack, before forming Warlock with Peter Szigeti, Rudy Graf, Thomas Studier, and Michael Eurich in 1982.

=== The Warlock years (1982–1988) ===
Für immer (1987)
"Für Immer" is the only song by Warlock with lyrics in German and was the last single issued by the band.

Warlock signed their first recording contract with Mausoleum Records and released their debut album Burning the Witches in 1984. Doro attracted immediately the attention of fans and press, becoming the spokesperson and the main means of promotion for the band. The mix of traditional heavy metal and power ballads, together with her voice and stage presence led Warlock to success, an exception in the 80s' metal scene dominated by male-fronted metal bands. Warlock signed a new contract with the major label Phonogram and released the albums Hellbound in 1985 and True as Steel in 1986, sharing the stage of European rock festivals with some of the best hard rock and heavy metal bands of the period. On 16 August 1986, Doro was the first woman to front a metal band at the Monsters of Rock festival in Castle Donington, England, the most important European rock meeting of the 1980s. Warlock's lengthy tours in Europe, supporting W.A.S.P. and Judas Priest, pushed Doro to give up her day job as a graphic designer to devote her life to music. In this period she also received vocal coaching.

After the completion of the tour in support of True as Steel, Doro took charge of business and went to live in New York City, where Warlock recorded their fourth and final studio album Triumph and Agony (1987). The album was their most successful, going Gold in Germany and reaching No. 80 in the Billboard 200 US album chart. It includes the songs "All We Are" and "Für immer" (Forever), Warlock's best known tracks, also because of the intense rotation of their videos on MTV. Warlock opened for Dio in Europe and embarked on their only US tour, supporting Megadeth. At the end of the US tour, Doro remained the sole German in the band after all the other original members had quit, replaced by American musicians. In 1989, while writing material for the follow-up to Triumph and Agony, she lost a legal cause with the band's former manager for the rights to the name and merchandise of Warlock. Her record label forced her to accept the publication of new albums under the name Doro, in order to continue her career. Doro persevered in the legal battle for the Warlock name and eventually regained the rights in 2011.

=== Doro in the US (1989–1990) ===
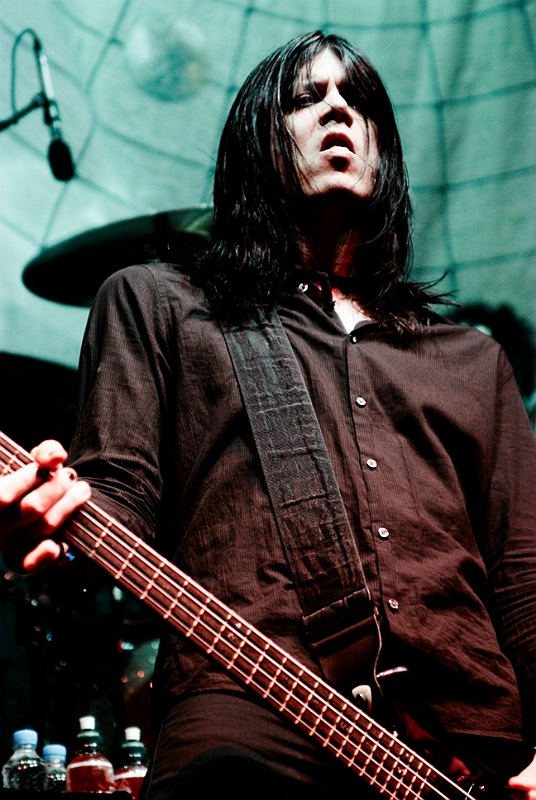
Nick Douglas is the bass player in Doro's band since 1990. He was also a touring musician for Blaze Bayley and Chris Caffery among others.

What was initially intended as the fifth Warlock album resulted in Force Majeure, the first Doro album, released in February 1989. It was recorded in the US by Joey Balin, and is the natural successor of Triumph and Agony, continuing the band's drift towards radio-friendly glam metal in contrast with the European power metal of Warlock's earlier works. The album sold quite well in Europe, but it had limited success in the US, lurking at the bottom of the Billboard 200 chart.

Following the tour to promote Force Majeure, the final Warlock line-up disbanded and Doro concentrated on her solo career. She decided to keep her Swiss manager Alex Grob, but renounced to be part of a band with whom to share songwriting duties and career decisions. She contacted Kiss bassist and childhood idol Gene Simmons, who was taking a second career as talent scout and record producer. Simmons was willing to start a collaboration and produced the album Doro, with the help of Black 'n Blue guitarist Tommy Thayer and Pat Regan. Doro was recorded in California with large use of writers and session musicians from the Kiss entourage. Doro recently declared that Simmons "was the best producer we ever had!"

A band formed by the American musicians Thomas Jude on guitars, Paul Morris on keyboards, Nick Douglas on bass and Tom Coombs on drums was assembled for the supporting tour. Doro was a more commercial offering than the previous album, but resulted in a flop in the US. On the contrary, it sold well in Europe, accelerating PolyGram's decision to interrupt the publication of Doro's albums in America, where the commercial appeal of glam metal and classic rock acts was rapidly declining in favor of grunge and alternative rock. Doro concluded 1990 playing some dates in Germany, opening for Scorpions.

=== Doro in Europe (1991–1999) ===
The German singer experimented a new direction for her music in 1991, when she recorded the album True at Heart in country music haven Nashville, Tennessee, with local musicians and mainstream producer Barry Beckett. Dann Huff of the melodic hard rock band Giant contributed his lead guitar work to the album. New band members Michael Tyrrell on guitar, Jeff Bruno on guitar and keyboards, and Tony Mac on drums were recruited for the following European tour.

Despite living in the US and losing visibility in the English-spoken media, Doro remained very popular in Germany, where her albums always charted and where in 1991 she sang on a charity song by the "German Rock Project" called "Let Love Conquer the World".

Returning in the US after the European tour, Doro was put in contact with Jack Ponti, a mainstream songwriter and producer from New Jersey, to work on her next two albums. Ponti at the time was the producer of some minor glam metal acts and the A&R manager of Skid Row and Nelson. The album Angels Never Die, released in 1993, was produced and largely written and performed by Ponti himself and Vic Pepe with the help of various session musicians. It contains a mix of melodic hard rock songs and power ballads, typical of the commercial pop metal albums of the period. The album had limited success in Europe, but the video for the song "Bad Blood" was voted Best Anti-Racism Video during the first MTV Europe Music Awards ceremony in 1994. The tour in support of Angels Never Die introduced in the line-up of Doro's band the American musicians Joe Taylor (ex-Lita Ford Band) on lead guitar, Jimmy DiLella (ex-Waysted, Mariah and Tyketto) on guitar and keyboards, and Chris Branco on drums; Branco was soon replaced by Johnny Dee (ex-Waysted and Britny Fox) and this line-up recorded in 1993 the live album Doro Live, released also in VHS. Doro headlined her first Wacken Open Air festival on 20 August 1993.

Machine II Machine, the second album produced by Jack Ponti, was created through the collaborative efforts of musicians with very different musical backgrounds. The result is an album that explores new grounds for Doro, bringing her sound closer to mainstream rock music. Machine II Machine was mixed by Kevin Shirley and released in 1995. It was her last studio album published by PolyGram/Vertigo, finally fulfilling the ten-year contract with the label that Warlock had signed in 1985. PolyGram did not renovate her contract and Doro entered in negotiations with other record labels. Russ Irwin and Frank Ferrer replaced respectively DiLella and Dee for the following tour. In a pause of her touring schedule in October 1995, Doro made her acting debut as a guest star on the German television soap opera Verbotene Liebe (Forbidden Love). In various interviews Doro remembered how "it was pretty difficult to carry on" as a heavy metal musician in those years and how she was sometimes reduced to odd jobs like singing at weddings and private parties.

The climate of metal wasn't good for the last five years (...) Grunge was around and bands like Nirvana were really big. Metal just went underground. Nobody really supported it, especially record labels.

— Doro Pesch (2000)

Doro signed a worldwide contract with the major record label WEA (now Warner Music Group) at the end of 1995 and started writing new material with Jürgen Engler and Chris Lietz of the German industrial metal and EBM band Die Krupps, who she had met while working on remixes of songs from Machine II Machine. Doro also worked on other songs with Jimmy Harry and Fred Maher in the US. The resulting album, titled Love Me in Black, took three years to be completed and features a massive use of electronics and drum machines, along with a heavier sound than its predecessors. WEA judged the album unsuitable for the US market and published it only in Germany. American guitarist Mario Parrillo (ex-Detente and Fear of God) joined Taylor, Douglas and the returning Johnny Dee in Doro's band for the following tour, which included another participation at the Wacken Open Air festival.

After the Love Me in Black tour in 1998, Doro parted ways with WEA, unsatisfied of the scarce promotion that the album had received, and signed with the German label SPV/Steamhammer. Through the decisive action of her American fan club, she also received and accepted a proposal from Koch Records for a US deal.

=== The return (2000–2003) ===
In 2000, the album Calling the Wild was published in two different versions in Europe and in the US, with the latter containing also re-recorded and remixed versions of songs from Love Me in Black. The tracks of Calling the Wild are played by a large number of session musicians and feature contributions from Bob Kulick, Slash, Al Pitrelli and Eric Singer. The album includes the songs "Love Me Forever" and "Alone Again", recorded in California with the leader of the English band Motörhead Ian 'Lemmy' Kilmister, starting a tradition of singing duets that Doro maintained for all the 2000s and beyond. The music of Calling the Wild is straight hard rock and heavy metal, in Doro's words going "from super heavy to super sensitive with good messages", and leaves behind the experimental twists of her works of the 1990s. The song "Burn It Up" was written to be the anthem of the Düsseldorf–based NFL Europe American football team Rhein Fire.

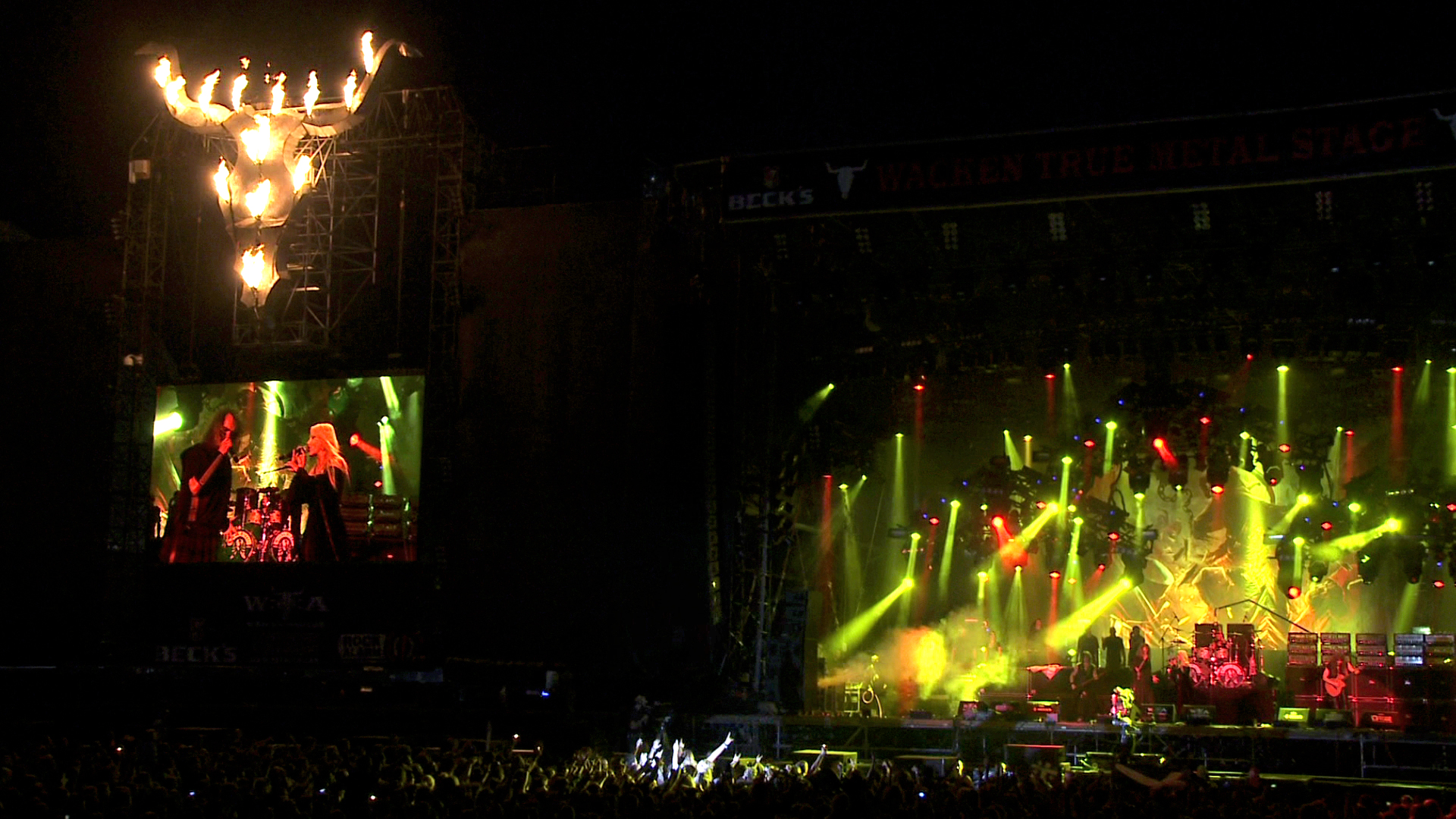
Doro on stage with Grave Digger and Van Canto at Wacken Open Air 2010; she is a veteran of the festival, where she played with her band or as guest for eight times.

At the beginning of the century Doro made her comeback in the US with a date at New Jersey Metal Meltdown II festival in March. She then started her first US tour in ten years supporting Dio and Yngwie Malmsteen, and received a very warm welcome from the audience. Doro's band toured also in Europe, visiting Russia for the first time, and Pesch made a guest appearance at Wacken Open Air 2001 for a duet with Sabina Classen of the German thrash metal band Holy Moses on the song "Too Drunk to Fuck".

While touring with Dio in the US in late 2000, Mario Parrillo fell ill and died a short time later from an undiagnosed form of cancer. Oliver Palotai, a young German-Hungarian classically trained musician, took his place on guitar and keyboards in Doro's band after the end of the tour.

Doro was again in a recording studio to produce her eighth studio album, titled Fight, in 2002. Before the album release, she played, among others, at the two largest German metal festivals, Wacken Open Air and Bang Your Head. The new album was the first to feature the creative contribution of all the members of her touring band, who played in all the tracks. Guest musicians on the album were Jean Beauvoir, Chris Caffery, Russ Ballard and Type O Negative singer Peter Steele, who sang in a duet with Doro on "Descent". The song "Always Live to Win" replaced "Burn It Up" as Rhein Fire's anthem, while the song "Fight" was the first of four anthems composed by Doro and used to introduce the fights of her friend and German female boxing champion Regina Halmich (the others are "She's Like Thunder", "The Queen" and a new version of "All We Are"). Because of her friendship with Halmich, Doro was involved in an exhibition match on German RTL Television, which opposed her to Michaela Schaffrath.

=== Continued popularity (2003–2010) ===
By 2003, both fans, press and internet community had often referred to Doro with the moniker Metal Queen, to show their respect and deference for the uninterrupted career of the German singer on the heavy metal scene. During her European tour with Saxon, Bonfire and Circle II Circle, Doro organized a special concert at Phillips Halle in Düsseldorf to celebrate the 20th anniversary of the release of her first album, Burning the Witches, and invited many musicians that she had befriended and collaborated with in her career. On 13 December 2003, she performed in front of more than 6,000 people with guests Blaze Bayley, Udo Dirkschneider, Lemmy, Mikkey Dee, Jean Beauvoir, Claus Lessmann and members of Saxon and Circle II Circle. During the show, Doro played three songs with her former bandmates of Warlock, in their line-up of 1986. The concert was released on a double DVD in 2006 with the title 20 Years – A Warrior Soul.

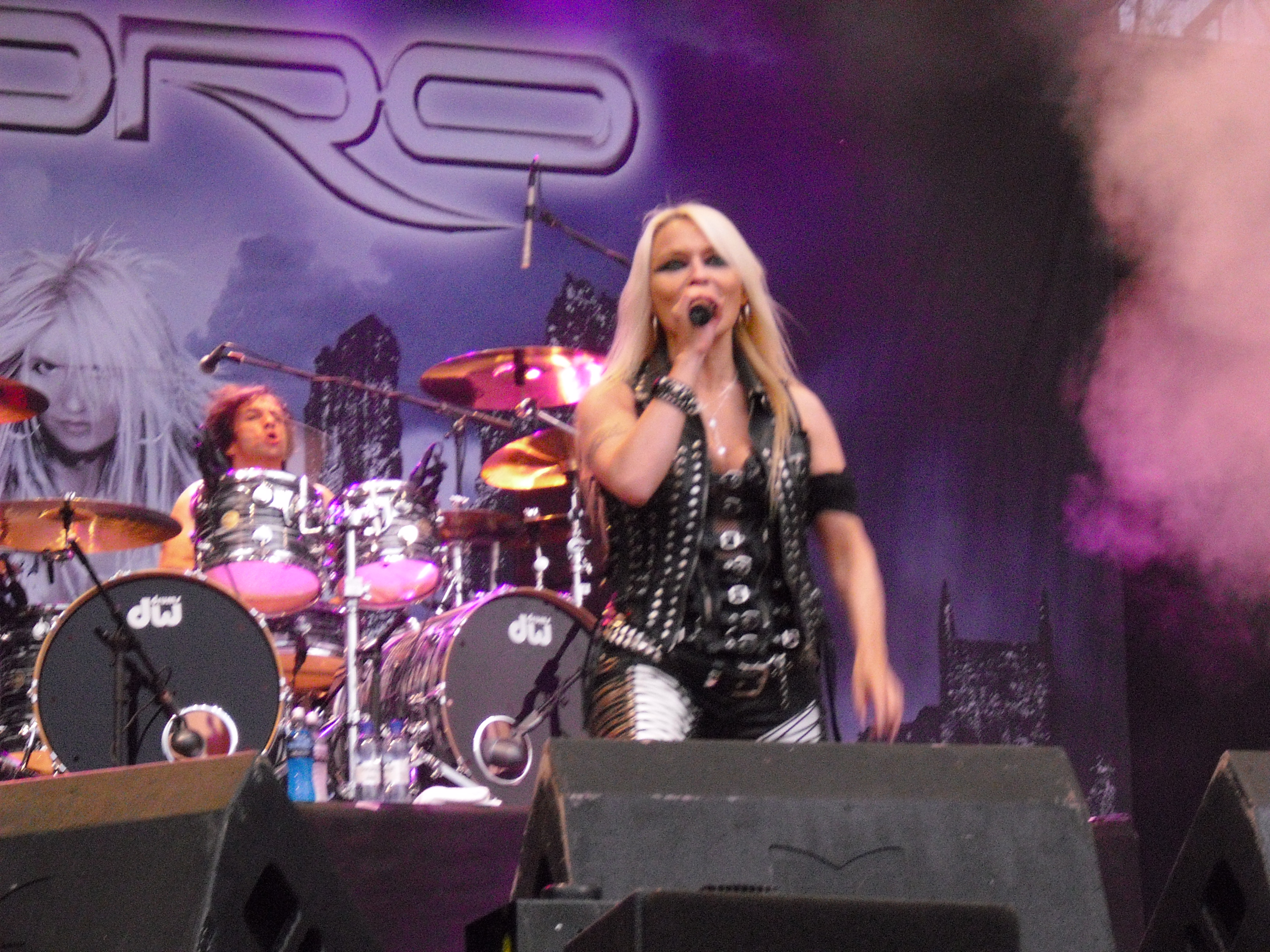
Doro performing live at Norway Rock Festival in 2009; drummer Johnny Dee in the background

The long world tour to promote Fight brought Doro for the first time in some countries of Eastern Europe, in Australia and Thailand. Live footage from that tour was published in the double DVD Für Immer of 2003, which went Gold in Germany. She also held two concerts in Germany with a full symphonic orchestra, where she converted her rock songs to new acoustic and classical versions. These new live experiences pushed her to experiment the recording of a full acoustic and symphonic album, containing both new and re-arranged songs. The production of Classic Diamonds took eight months, requiring a thirty-elements symphonic orchestra and the arranging abilities of Oliver Palotai and producer Torsten Sickert to be completed. The album was released by AFM Records in September 2004, and Doro went on tour in Europe with her usual touring band and elements of the orchestra to offer semi-acoustic shows. The tour had started with a live performance of Doro and the Classic Night Orchestra at Wacken Open Air 2004, the first time ever of a full symphonic orchestra at the renowned German metal festival. Her acoustic performance included also a duet with Blaze Bayley on the Iron Maiden song "Fear of the Dark". In the same night, Doro was reunited again with her bandmates of Warlock to perform their old songs.

The EP Let Love Rain on Me, containing single versions of songs from Classic Diamonds, was an unexpected hit in Spain, where it reached No. 7 in the Singles chart.

In 2004, Doro recorded with actor Dirk Bach a metal version of the song "Gimme Gimme Gimme" and performed it live on stage on the ABBA Mania Show of German RTL Television.

Doro Pesch was cast as the warrior Meha in the prehistoric action movie Anuk-Der Weg des Kriegers (Anuk-The Way of the Warrior), written, directed and interpreted by Luke Gasser and shot in Switzerland in 2005. The film was released in 2006 and features also Marc Storace, lead singer of the Swiss hard rock band Krokus. During the period of shooting, she wrote and recorded new songs in Switzerland with local session musicians and the production of Gasser, who used three of those songs for the soundtrack of the movie. More songs were recorded in Germany in the spare time between tours with her band and usual collaborators, and released in 2006 in the album Warrior Soul. The screenplay for a second movie with the same cast was written in the following years and Gasser finally found the funding to start production in 2012.

In the same year, Doro Pesch contributed to the benefit CD for the museum association of Borussia Dortmund the song entitled "Tief in meinem Herzen" (Deep in My Heart), a modified version of her classic "Für Immer" re-written for this purpose. She also did a live performance at the Westfalen Stadium before a game of Borussia Dortmund and was one of the first visitors in Borusseum, when it opened. Her father was a fan of Borussia, she said in an interview with the spokesperson of the BVB.

In the following tour Doro was present at various festivals around the world. Among them, the band headlined the very first female-fronted metal US festival Flight of the Valkyries on 27 June 2007 in Saint Paul, Minnesota. They were also at the Summer Breeze Open Air festival in Dinkelsbühl, Bavaria in August 2007, at the fifth edition of the Metal Female Voices Fest in Wieze, Belgium on 19 October 2007, where she dueted with Sabina Classen on "All We Are", and at the Heavy Christmas Meeting on 15 December 2007 in Düsseldorf. In July 2008, they were at the Magic Circle Festival in Bad Arolsen, Germany and at Hard Rock Hell in Prestatyn, Wales on 5 December 2008. Doro's band visited for the first time China in November 2008. Chris Caffery replaced Joe Taylor on lead guitar for some US dates in 2007, and also Oliver Palotai had to be replaced in various tour dates by Italian guitarist Luca Princiotta, because of his multiple commitments with Blaze, Kamelot and Sons of Seasons.

Both Taylor and Palotai were in the band on 13 December 2008 at the more than three-hour special concert that Doro held at ISS Dome in Düsseldorf to celebrate her 25th anniversary of activity in front of 9,000 spectators. The show was introduced by performances of the bands Holy Moses, Leaves' Eyes and Arch Enemy. The main part began with songs from Doro's career, including duets with Bobby Ellsworth (Overkill), Jean Beauvoir, Chris Boltendahl (Grave Digger), Axel Rudi Pell, Klaus Meine and Rudolf Schenker (Scorpions), Tarja Turunen (ex-Nightwish), Warrel Dane (Nevermore), Liv Kristine, Floor Jansen, Ji-In Cho, Girlschool and other female singers who had sung in the single "Celebrate", issued a few months before the show. The show included another reunion of the 1986 formation of Warlock and culminated with all the guests, other musicians (like Alexander Krull, Tom Angelripper, members of Saltatio Mortis) and friends of the German singer on stage to sing "All We Are". The event was recorded and released in 2010 in the double DVD 25 Years in Rock... and Still Going Strong by Nuclear Blast, Doro's new record label.

A few days after the show and despite a precarious health state due to strong eye inflammation, Doro was in Tilburg, the Netherlands, to participate at the first edition of Christmas Metal Symphony, where she sang accompanied by a band of Dutch metal musicians and by a symphonic orchestra.

Doro's album Fear No Evil was released in January 2009 and entered in many charts all over Europe. It was her last collaboration with guitarist Joe Taylor, who left to join Cycle of Pain. His place in the band was taken by the Dutch guitarist Bas Maas (ex-After Forever). The line-up of Pesch, Maas, Princiotta, Douglas and Dee went on a world tour for most of 2009 and 2010, reaching North and South America, Russia, China and, for the first time, Japan. Doro supported Saxon in their 2009 UK tour and Motörhead in Germany in 2010. During this prolonged time on the road, guitarist Princiotta was sometimes substituted by Robert Katrikh or by Harrison Young. Doro's band appeared at festivals all over the world, including Wacken Open Air and Metal Female Voices Fest 7 (where she dueted again with Tarja Turunen) in 2009, Hellfest in France, Bang Your Head!!! in Germany and Bloodstock Open Air in Great Britain in 2010.

In 2009, she wrote the Wacken anthem "We Are the Metalheads" for the 20th anniversary of Wacken Open Air festival. The song was released as single on 30 July 2009 and was performed by Doro Pesch and Wacken-organizer Thomas Jensen's ex-band Skyline.

We Are the Metalheads (2009)
The official Wacken Hymn, performed by Doro and Skyline.

=== Doro in the 2010s and beyond (2010–present) ===
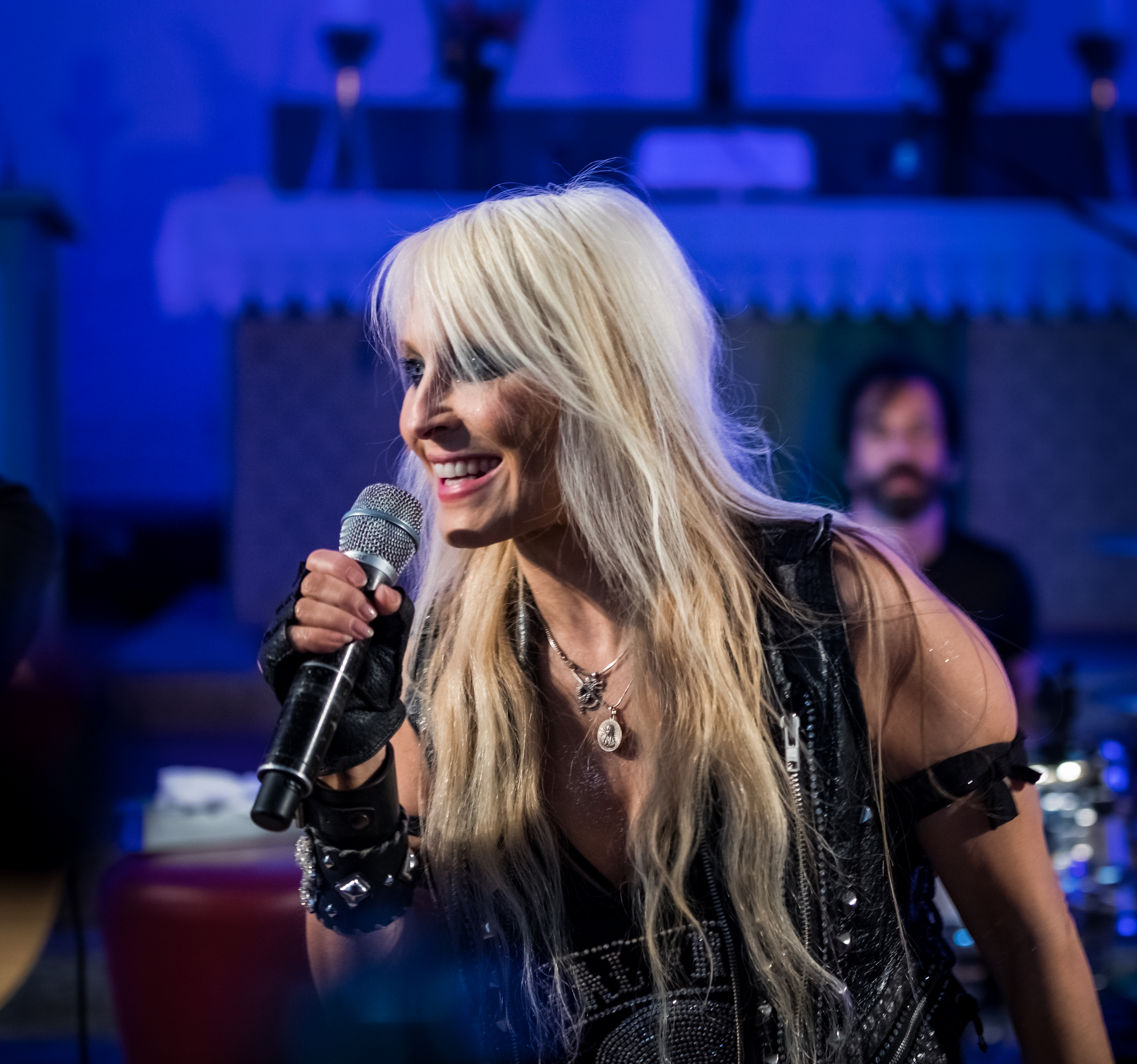
Doro at Wacken Open Air 2018

On 13 March 2010, Doro celebrated her 2500th live show with a special concert in Düsseldorf with guests Krypteria, Luke Gasser, Marc Storace, Schmier (from the band Destruction), Sabina and Andy Classen. Also in 2010, Doro, Schmier, Mille Petrozza (Kreator) and Alf Ator (Knorkator) lent their voices to the German version of Metalocalypse, the US animated show about Dethklok, the world's most popular death metal band.

Doro was again on tour in 2011 and participated at Metal Female Voices Fest 9. She also toured Spain and Italy as guest vocalist for the tribute band Dio Disciples, formed by musicians of the band Dio which performed songs taken from the long career of the late Ronnie James Dio. In 2010, she had already participated in Germany to a tribute benefit concert for the Stand Up and Shout Cancer foundation for cancer research, which celebrated the life and work of Dio.

In 2012 she recorded in the US, Germany and Scandinavia songs for a new album titled Raise Your Fist, released in October. The first single "Raise Your Fist in the Air" was released in August 2012.

In June 2013, the music magazine Metal Hammer assigned Doro the Golden God Legend award. Two months later, she performed at the Wacken Open Air music festival.

To celebrate her 30th stage anniversary, Doro held a two-day concert at CCD Stadthalle in her hometown of Düsseldorf on 2 and 3 May 2014. She was accompanied by the Classic Night Orchestra for the first show. Guest singers included Biff Byford, Chris Caffery, Udo Dirkshneider, Blaze Bayley, Marc Storace, Tom Angelripper, Mr Lordi and Hansi Kürsch. Also the Lordi-guitarist Amen was featured on the show on 2 May.

Doro continued touring and had more celebratory shows in the following years, although with less tight schedules than in the past. She released her first album in six years, Forever Warriors, Forever United, on 17 August 2018, entering in many charts worldwide.

By November 2019, Doro had begun writing new material for her fourteenth album. Her new single "Brickwall" was released digitally on 26 June 2020, with a vinyl version to be released on 31 July. The song was expected appear on her then-upcoming fourteenth album, which was due for release in 2021, though it was later pushed back to 2022. In May 2023, Doro announced Conqueress - Forever Strong and Proud as the album's title, released on 27 October.

On 13 June 2020, Doro performed at the CARantena-Arena in Worms, Germany, becoming the first heavy metal artist to hold a drive-in concert during the COVID-19 pandemic. She remarked, "Over the last few weeks I've really missed my fans and also my band. The drive-in show has been a real unique experience and career highlight for me. It feels great to rock out together again. Hopefully, we can soon enjoy normal shows again as well."

In March 2024, the she participated in the Hell's Heroes music festival, which took place at White Oak Music Hall in Houston and was headlined by Sodom and Queensrÿche.

In a September 2024 interview with Metal Rules, drummer Johnny Dee confirmed that Doro could begin working on her next album at the end of the year. A new song, "Warriors of the Sea", was released on 23 May 2025. Doro has described it as "an anthem for all you pirates, at sea and on land, wherever you like to rock out. A song for all the metal cruises and summer festivals." The song later surfaced on the compilation album, also titled Warriors of the Sea, released on 24 October 2025.

Doro performed at the Hell's Heroes music festival in Houston in March 2026. Her upcoming fifteenth album, Wild at Heart, will be released on 11 December 2026 to coincide with the "Magic Winter" tour.

== Duets ==
Doro Pesch is well known in the metal scene for her many duets with both expert singers and new artists. The duets started to indulge the wish of the German singer to work with artists that she admired and that had influenced her. She found the amicable availability of many musicians she had met in her career to contribute to her albums and live performances and, as an exchange of favors between singers, she appeared both in live shows and in studio albums of those same artists. This happened, for example, with Udo Dirkschneider in the rock ballad "Dancing with an Angel" and with Twisted Sister on the song "White Christmas" on their album A Twisted Christmas of 2004.

New bands and artists often requested Doro's vocals to enhance their productions, usually with the same mechanism of reciprocity, like After Forever on the song "Who I Am" and Tarja Turunen on the song "The Seer". Both After Forever's singer Floor Jansen and Turunen appeared also as guest singers in Doro's albums and live shows. The band Krypteria, which had opened for Doro in the tours of 2009 and 2010, obtained a duet with Ji-In Cho on their song "Victoria" in a similar way.

Frequent occasions for live duets happen during tours, such as the 2010 European tour with Motörhead, when Doro and Lemmy used to perform the band's famous tunes like for instance "Killed by Death" and "Born to Raise Hell", or with Saxon in 2011 when performing Saxon's song "Denim & Leather".

More recently, Doro has contributed to the song "A Dream That Cannot Be" by Swedish melodic death metal band Amon Amarth, on their album Jomsviking, released in 2016.

== Reception and legacy ==
In the 1980s the presence of women in rock, and in particular in heavy metal bands, was usually considered by press and fans more for glamour and sexual exploitation than for the musicianship showed. Doro Pesch was one of the few exceptions; her qualities as vocalist and songwriter in Warlock, her commitment in promoting their music and her avoidance of posturing as a sex symbol won the respect of a solid fan base in the expanding European metal scene of that period, ensuring a long string of favorable articles and covers on the principal European metal magazines. In an interview in 2006 Doro remembered how "we lived in paradise and had not noticed it, (...) we thought at the time, that now it goes on and on and the success would continue automatically, (...) then came the great awakening".

Warlock were starting to make a solid reputation in the US, when the taste of the audience for classic metal acts shifted in favor of grunge, leaving the singer's mission to conquer the American market incomplete. On the contrary, in her home country fans and press remained always loyal and favorable to Doro, who received in her career five nominations for the German Echo music award, which she won in 1994 as Best National Female Artist.

Her frequent European tours in the 1990s maintained her visibility in the eyes of the fans and granted her enough income to survive the bleak period. She became so popular in Spain that she was voted for 13 times Best International Singer by the readers of the music magazine Heavy Rock in their annual polls. She often declared to live and tour for the fans and said that she "would never cancel a tour and everybody knows that about me". Lemmy, in a 2003 interview, testified how professional Doro is.

With the return of heavy metal in the charts worldwide and the diffusion on the internet of hundreds of webzines and fanzines dedicated to hard rock, Doro again rose to popularity in the metal scene, performing worldwide and inspiring new female singers. Her career and commitment are held in high esteem by the new generation of female heavy metal singers. As Floor Jansen of After Forever stated in a 2007 interview, to duet with Doro "was a huge honor and we chose her because she was a pioneer of the female fronted scene". Doro herself was apparently aware early in her career to have the role "to give other women self-confidence" in the metal world, acting as a pioneer for female fans and musicians.

As further evidence of her influence on the heavy metal scene, in December 2008 Pure Steel Records released Tribute to Steel: A Tribute to Warlock, the first official tribute album to Warlock and Doro; the album includes contributions from bands like Custard, Crystal Viper, Sabaton and Lonewolf, paying homage to the songs of Doro's first four albums with the participation of Warlock's original members.

== Personal life ==
I have no kids or a husband. I'm married to the band, crew and the fans (...) That is my family.

— Doro Pesch (2006)

Pesch has eschewed marriage and family life, allowing her to focus all of her energy on her music and her relationship with her fans. The lyrics of the song "You Are My Family", which opens the album Warrior Soul, exemplify this decision. After the death of her father in 2000, her mother Barbara manages the Doro fan club.

She has homes in Düsseldorf, and on Long Island, New York, where she usually resided when not on tour, until her house was destroyed by Hurricane Irene in August 2011. She received her green card to live and work in the US in 1991. Pesch owns, together with former Die Krupps members Chris Lietz and Jürgen Engler, Atom H recording studios in Düsseldorf, where she has recorded some of her albums.

Pesch is a vegan. Her stage clothes are handmade, following models she designs and using synthetic materials which imitate leather, in line with her relationship with PETA. She tries to support organizations that fight against injustice, particular against women and girls. Doro has trained in Thai boxing, a sport that she started practicing in 1995. She enjoys graphic arts and painting.

== Band members ==
Current line-up

Image	Name	Years active	Instruments	Release contributions
	Doro Pesch	1988–present	lead vocals	all releases
	Nick Douglas	1990–2020; 2025–present	bass; keyboards; backing vocals	all releases from Angels Never Die (1993) to Forever Warriors, Forever United (2018)
	Johnny Dee	1993–1995; 1998–present	drums; backing vocals	Doro Live (1993); Machine II Machine (1995); all releases from Fight (2002) onwards
	Bas Maas	2009–present	guitars; backing vocals	Anthems for the Champion – The Queen (2007); all releases from Raise Your Fist (2012) onwards
	Bill Hudson	2021–present	guitars; backing vocals	Conqueress - Forever Strong and Proud (2023)

Former

Image	Name	Years active	Instruments	Release contributions
	Jon Levin	1988–1989	guitars	Force Majeure (1989)
	Tommy Henriksen	1988–1989	bass; backing vocals	Force Majeure (1989)
	Bobby Rondinelli	1988–1989	drums	Force Majeure (1989)
	Paul Morris	1989–1990	keyboards	Doro (1990)
	Tom Coombs	1990	drums	none
	Thomas Jude	1990	guitars	none
	Michael S. Tyrrell aka Michael Shawn	1991–1992	guitars	none
	Jeff Bruno	1991–1992	guitars; keyboards	none
	Tony Mac	1991–1992	drums	none
	Chris Branco	1993	drums	none
	Joe Taylor	1993–2009	guitars; backing vocals	Doro Live (1993); all releases from Calling the Wild (2000) to 25 Years in Rock... and Still Going Strong (2010)
	Jimmy DiLella	1993–1995	guitars; keyboards; backing vocals	Doro Live (1993)
	Frank Ferrer	1995–1996	drums	none
	Russ Irwin	1995–1996	guitars; keyboards	none
	Mario Parillo	1998–2001	guitars; keyboards	Calling the Wild (2000)
	Oliver Palotai	2001–2009	keyboards; guitars; backing vocals	all releases from Fight (2002) to 25 Years in Rock... and Still Going Strong (2010)
	Robert Katrikh	2008	guitars	none
	Harrison Young	2009–2015; 2021	guitars (2009–2015); bass (2021); keyboards; backing vocals	none
	Luca Princiotta	2008–2021	keyboards; guitars; backing vocals	all releases from Celebrate – The Night of the Warlock (2008) to Forever Warriors, Forever United (2018)
	Chris Caffery	2014–2018	guitars	In Liebe und Freundschaft (2005)
	Stefan Herkenhoff	2021–2025	bass; keyboards; backing vocals	Conqueress - Forever Strong and Proud (2023), Warriors Of The Sea (Single, 2025)
	Tilen Hudrap	2022 (Touring)	bass; backing vocals	none

== Discography ==
=== Studio albums ===
- Force Majeure (1989)
- Doro (1990)
- True at Heart (1991)
- Angels Never Die (1993)
- Machine II Machine (1995)
- Love Me in Black (1998)
- Calling the Wild (2000)
- Fight (2002)
- Classic Diamonds (2004)
- Warrior Soul (2006)
- Fear No Evil (2009)
- Raise Your Fist (2012)
- Forever Warriors, Forever United (2018)
- Conqueress – Forever Strong and Proud (2023)
- Wild at Heart (2026)

=== with Warlock ===
- Burning the Witches (1984)
- Hellbound (1985)
- True as Steel (1986)
- Triumph and Agony (1987)

== Filmography ==
- Soaring Highs and Brutal Lows: The Voices of Women in Metal (2015)
