= Burning the Witches =

Studio album by Warlock
- Released: 24 March 1984
- Recorded: November 1983
- Studios: Studio Klangwerkstatt, Düsseldorf, Germany
- Genre: Heavy metal
- Length: 35:33
- Label: Mausoleum
- Producer: Axel Thubeauville

Warlock chronology
Burning the Witches (1984)	Hellbound (1985)

Singles from Burning the Witches
- 1. "Without You" / "Burning the Witches" Released: 1984

Professional ratings
Review scores
Source	Rating
AllMusic	4/5 stars
Collector's Guide to Heavy Metal	6/10
Kerrang!	(favorable)
Metal Forces	(9/10)

Burning the Witches is the debut studio album by the German heavy metal band Warlock, released in 1984 through the Belgian independent label Mausoleum Records. The album was re-released in late 1984 by Vertigo Records, which went on to release all future Warlock albums.

== Track listing ==
Side one
No.	Title	Writer(s)	Length
1.	"Sign of Satan"	Rudy Graf	3:13
2.	"After the Bomb"	Peter Szigeti, Graf	3:50
3.	"Dark Fade"	Szigeti, Doro Pesch	4:07
4.	"Homicide Rocker"	Graf	3:12
5.	"Without You"	Szigeti, Pesch	5:25

Side two
No.	Title	Writer(s)	Length
6.	"Metal Racer"	Graf	3:42
7.	"Burning the Witches"	Graf	4:17
8.	"Hateful Guy"	Graf, Pesch	3:41
9.	"Holding Me"	Szigeti, Pesch	4:07

== Personnel ==
=== Warlock ===
- Doro Pesch – vocals
- Peter Szigeti – guitar
- Rudy Graf – guitar
- Frank Rittel – bass
- Michael Eurich – drums

=== Production ===
- Axel Thubeauville – producer
- Ralf Hubert – engineer
- Peter Zimmerman – executive producer, management
- Rainer Assmann and Henry Staroste – remixing (uncredited)
- Nico Chiriatti – album concept

== Charts ==
Chart (1987)	Peak position
German Albums (Offizielle Top 100)	39
