= Hellbound (Warlock album) =

Studio album by Warlock
- Released: 1985
- Recorded: February–April 1985
- Studio: Country Lane (Munich, Germany)
- Genre: Heavy metal
- Length: 36:18
- Label: Vertigo
- Producer: Henry Staroste, Rainer Assmann

Warlock chronology
Burning the Witches (1984)	Hellbound (1985)	True as Steel (1986)

Singles from Hellbound
- 1. "All Night" / "Hellbound" Released: 1985

Professional ratings
Review scores
Source	Rating
AllMusic	3/5 stars
Collector's Guide to Heavy Metal	6/10
Kerrang!	4/5 stars

Hellbound is the second studio album by German heavy metal band Warlock, released in 1985 by Vertigo Records.

== Track listing ==
Side one
No.	Title	Writer(s)	Length
1.	"Hellbound"	Peter Szigeti, Henry Staroste, Doro Pesch, Frank Rittel, Michael Eurich, Rudy Graf	3:42
2.	"All Night"	Szigeti, Staroste, René Maué, Graf, Rittel, Eurich, Pesch	4:06
3.	"Earthshaker Rock"	Graf, Rittel, Pesch, Szigeti, Eurich	3:27
4.	"Wrathchild"	Szigeti, Staroste, Pesch, Rittel, Eurich, Graf	3:35
5.	"Down and Out"	Graf, Rittel, Pesch, Szigeti, Eurich	4:06

Side two
No.	Title	Writer(s)	Length
6.	"Out of Control"	Graf, Staroste, Pesch, Maué, Rittel, Szigeti, Eurich	4:50
7.	"Time to Die"	Graf, Staroste, Pesch, Rittel, Szigeti, Eurich	4:28
8.	"Shout It Out"	Szigeti, Staroste, Pesch, Rittel, Eurich, Graf	4:20
9.	"Catch My Heart"	Szigeti, Maué, Pesch, Rittel, Eurich, Graf	4:55

2011 CD edition bonus tracks
No.	Title	Writer(s)	Length
10.	"Hellraiser"	Pesch, Joey Balin, Tommy Henriksen	4:50
11.	"Hellbound" (live)	Szigeti, Staroste, Pesch, Rittel, Eurich, Graf	3:40

== Personnel ==
=== Warlock ===
- Doro Pesch – vocals
- Rudy Graf – guitar
- Peter Szigeti – guitar
- Frank Rittel – bass
- Michael Eurich – drums

=== Production ===
- Henry Staroste – producer, arrangements, mixing
- Rainer Assmann – producer, engineer, mixing
- Harry Thumann – Fairlight programming
- Peter Zimmermann – management

== Charts ==
Chart (1985)	Peak position
German Albums (Offizielle Top 100)	53
