= Für immer (Warlock song) =

1987 single by Warlock

"Für Immer"

Single by Warlock

from the album Triumph and Agony
- Released: 1987
- Genre: Heavy metal
- Length: 8:36
- Label: Vertigo
- Songwriter(s): Doro Pesch, Joey Balin
- Producer(s): Joey Balin

Warlock singles chronology
"East Meets West" (1987)	"Für Immer" (1987)
- Warlock "Für immer" (1987) 25 second sample from Triumph and Agony.

"Für Immer"

Single by Doro
- Released: 2003
- Recorded: 2003
- Genre: Heavy metal
- Length: 9:40
- Label: SPV/Steamhammer
- Songwriter(s): Doro Pesch, Joey Balin

Doro singles chronology
"Fight" (2002)	"Für Immer" (2003)	"We're Like Thunder" (2005)

"Für Immer" ("Forever") is a song composed by the German heavy metal band Warlock, from their 1987 album Triumph and Agony. It was the band's sixth single and it was published by Vertigo Records.

== Review ==
The song was published for the second time in a live version as b-side of the Doro Pesch's single "Hard Times" in 1989. It was later published again in the compilation Rare Diamonds, released in March 1991 by PolyGram under the name Warlock & Doro. The video produced for this song and shot by Mark Rezyka is contained in the VHS video compilation with the same name. In 1998 the track was part of Doro's compilation The Ballads. In 2003 Doro Pesch released a live version of the song as single, published by SPV/Steamhammer. In 2004 the song had a "classic" treatment, with strings and acoustic guitars, on Doro's album Classic Diamonds . In 2020 Doro Pesch, Gil Ofarim, Henning Wehland from the H-Blockx and Alex Wesselsky from Eisbrecher released a new version of the song in view of the corona crisis.

== Track listing ==
1. "Für Immer" - 4:12
2. "Metal Tango" - 4:24

== Doro — Für Immer ==
1. "Für Immer" (live radio edit) - 3:30
2. "Für Immer" (live version) - 6:10

== Cover ==
The Swedish band Sabaton released a cover of Für Immer on their 2006 album Attero Dominatus.
