= Mark Rezyka =

Canadian director

Mark Rezyka (born 11 June 1959 in Montreal, Canada) was best known as a top director of heavy metal music videos in the 1980s and 1990s. With partners Marcelo Epstein and Dominic Orlando, he founded Pendulum Productions in 1982, and directed over 300 music videos over the next 15 years. Artists included Quiet Riot, Kiss, Ratt, Cinderella, Whitesnake, Survivor, Foreigner, Cheap Trick, and Joan Jett, among others.

Rezyka wrote and directed TV commercials and TV shows, including The CBS Fall Campaign 2004, Gatorade, Jovan, Ford, General Motors, The Hitchhiker and "Monsters". He also wrote and directed the feature film South of Reno, and won the best cinematography prize for his work on 14 Ways to Wear Lipstick at the 2002 Slam Dance festival.

In 2005, Rezyka executive produced the CD/DVDs Spin the Bottle: an All-Star Tribute to Kiss and AC/DC: We Salute You.

== Music videos directed by Mark Rezyka ==
- Cheap Trick – "I Can't Take It" (1983)
- Lindsey Buckingham – "Holiday Road" (1983)
- Heart – "How Can I Refuse You" (1983)
- Ray Parker Jr. – "I Still Can't Get Over Lover Loving You" (1983)
- Quiet Riot – "Bang Your Head (Metal Health)" (1983)
- Quiet Riot – "Cum On Feel The Noize" (1983)
- Helix – "Gimme Gimme Good Lovin'" (1984)
- Danny Spanos – "Excuse Me" (1984)
- Pat Travers – "Killer" (1984)
- Pat Travers – "Women on the Edge" (1984)
- Pat Travers – "Louise" (1984)
- Pat Travers – "Hot Shot" (1984)
- Quiet Riot – "Mama Weer All Crazee Now" (1984)
- Kix – "Cold Shower" (1985)
- Mary Jane Girls – "In My House" (1985)
- Rene & Angela – "I'll Be Good" (1985)
- Rene & Angela – "You Don't Have To Cry" (1985)
- Survivor – "The Search Is Over" (1985)
- Sawyer Brown – "Step That Step" (1985)
- Cinderella – "Shake Me" (1986)
- Cinderella – "Nobody's Fool" (1986)
- Helloween – "Halloween" (1986)
- Cinderella – "Somebody Save Me" (1987)
- Warlock – "All We Are" (1987)
- Warlock – "Für Immer" (1988)
- Vixen – "Edge of a Broken Heart" (1988)
- Vixen – "Cryin" (1988)
- Winger – "Seventeen" (1988)
- Winger – "Headed for a Heartbreak" (1989)
- Stage Dolls – "Love Cries" (1989)
- Kix – "Don't Close Your Eyes" (1989)
- Lillian Axe - Show a Little Love" (1989)
- Mr. Big - "Addicted to that Rush" (1989)
- Gorky Park – "Within Your Eyes" (1989)
- Badlands – "Winter's Call" (1989)
- Lostboys – "Cryin' Out" (1990)
- REO Speedwagon – "Live It Up" (1990)
- Testament – "Souls of Black" (1990)
- Joan Jett – "Love Hurts" (1990)
- Kiss – "Forever" (1989)
- Tora Tora – "Phantom Rider" (1990)
- XYZ – "What Keeps Me Loving You" (1990)
- Thunder – "Back Street Symphony" (1990)
- Kiss – "Rise To It" (1989)
- Thunder – "Gimme Some Lovin'" (1990)
- Winger – "Easy Come, Easy Go" (1991)
- Firehouse – "Don't Treat Me Bad" (1991)
- Firehouse – "Love of a Lifetime" (1991)
- Nelson – "Only Time Will Tell" (1991)
- Silent Rage – "Rebel with a Cause" (1991)
- Foreigner – "Lowdown And Dirty" (1991)
- Kiss – "God Gave Rock & Roll To You II" (1991)
- Kix – "Same Jane" (1991)
- Spinal Tap – "Bitch School" (1992)
- Kiss – Every Time I Look at You (Version 1) (1992)
- Kiss - Kiss Konfidential live performance Director (1993)
