= Tommy Henriksen =

American musician (born 1964)

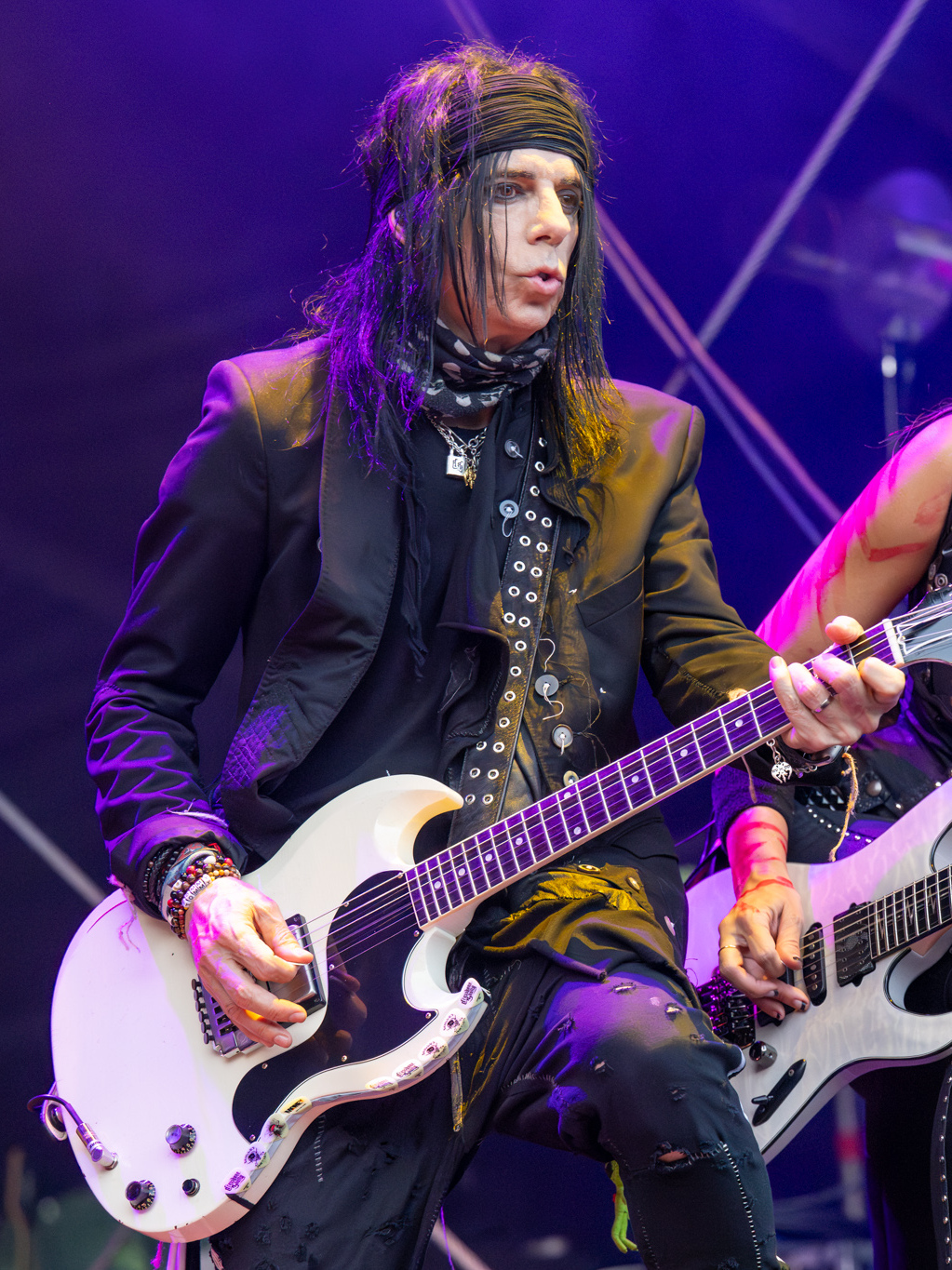
- Henriksen with Alice Cooper in 2024

Background information
- Born: February 21, 1964 (age 62); Port Jefferson Station, New York, U.S.
- Genres: Hard rock; heavy metal; punk rock
- Occupations: Musician, songwriter, producer
- Instruments: Guitar, bass, vocals, keyboards
- Years active: 1984–present

Tommy Henriksen (born February 21, 1964) is an American musician from Port Jefferson Station, New York, best known for his work as a guitarist, bassist and songwriter with Alice Cooper, Hollywood Vampires, Crossbone Skully and German metal band Warlock. He has also fronted punk rockers P.O.L. and released several albums as a solo artist. In addition, Henriksen is a songwriter, arranger, producer and mixer who has worked with artists such as Lady Gaga, Meat Loaf, Lou Reed, Halestorm, Kesha, and Daughtry. Henriksen currently lives with his family in Zurich, Switzerland.

== Biography ==
Henriksen was born in Port Jefferson, New York, as one of five children raised by a single mother who worked multiple jobs.

Henriksen got his start on the New York scene with the band Ruffkut which also featured his brother Gene on drums. After playing mostly covers initially, the group began writing their own material and issued the Fight for the Right mini-LP in 1984. In 1986, Henriksen joined German metal band Warlock and was featured on their 1987 album Triumph and Agony which went gold in Germany; the videos for the singles "All We Are" and "Für immer" were in regular rotation on MTV's heavy metal program Headbangers' Ball. Henriksen stuck around co-writing several songs as lead vocalist Doro Pesch lost the rights to the name Warlock and issued her next album Force Majeure, which also went gold, under the name Doro. Eventually, Henriksen, guitarist Jon Levin, and drummer Bobby Rondinelli all left the Doro camp and formed their own band, Big Trouble, with future Burning Rain and Montrose vocalist Keith St. John rounding out the line-up; another incarnation featured Eric St. Michaels (China, Criminal Minds) on vocals. Although signed to Atlantic Records the band split up without ever releasing an album. Henriksen left New York and moved to Los Angeles. After a brief stint with C.C. DeVille's ill-fated band Needle Park, with James Kottak and Kelly Hansen, he joined former Dokken bassist Jeff Pilson's band War & Peace, appearing on the band's 1993 debut album, Time Capsule, along with guitarist Russ Parrish, aka Satchel of Steel Panther, and future Enuff Z'nuff drummer Ricky Parent.

In 1994, Henriksen, taking on the alias Da Skunk, formed punk rock outfit P.O.L., short for Parade of Losers, signing a major label deal with Warner Bros. Records imprint Giant Records. The band's Garth Richardson produced self-titled debut was released in 1995 and the group appeared on The Jon Stewart Show playing their top 5 alternative single, "Stupid". P.O.L. issued their sophomore effort, Sprockett, on their own Junkrock label in 1996 before the album saw a wider release via Entourage Records. The song "Sixteen and Confused" would later become the alternate closing theme to Is It Fall Yet?, the first Daria TV film.

After the breakup of P.O.L., Henriksen began working Keith Forsey on a more pop oriented full-length solo album. Released by Capitol Records in 1999, the self-titled album included the hit single "I See the Sun", which reached #34 on the Adult Top 40 that year and was also included in the Blast from the Past movie soundtrack. In 2000, Henriksen released the follow-up, Selected Songs for a New Beginning, on his own ZuZu Ltd label. He also collaborated with former War & Peace bandmate Jeff Pilson in Underground Moon whose sole album was issued on the Nuclear Blast subsidiary Rebelution Entertainment in 2002.

In 2001, Henriksen teamed up with P.O.L. drummer and future Alice Cooper bandmate Glen Sobel to form girl-fronted sugar-punk band Boink!. They achieved popularity in LA, releasing a single and video, "Punk Break Beat", followed up by a 5-track EP, Walk of Fame. A huge Sex Pistols fan, Henriksen unleashed DiS ViciOuS in 2006, described by Tommy as being "another side of Sid Vicious". A few tracks were released via social networking, most of which were an anarchic rant against society, albeit rather tongue-in-cheek.

In 2007, Henriksen took on a producer/songwriter role for a project called The Audio Club, which included rapper Brooks Buford and singer Ashley Alan-Lee. The trio independently produced a music video for the single, "Sumthin' Serious". Though signed to Interscope Records, the group disbanded after disputes with their label.

Henriksen has worked as a songwriter, producer and mixer for such artists as Lady Gaga, Kesha, Daughtry, Kumi Koda, Porcelain Black, Meat Loaf, Cavo, Allison Iraheta, Atom Smash, Steel Magnolia, Alice, Tohoshinki, Kimberly Caldwell, Hyper Crush, The Canadian Tenors, Fefe Dobson, Lou Reed, Christian Kane, Alice Cooper, Simple Plan, Future Boy, The Rouge and David Cook, among others.

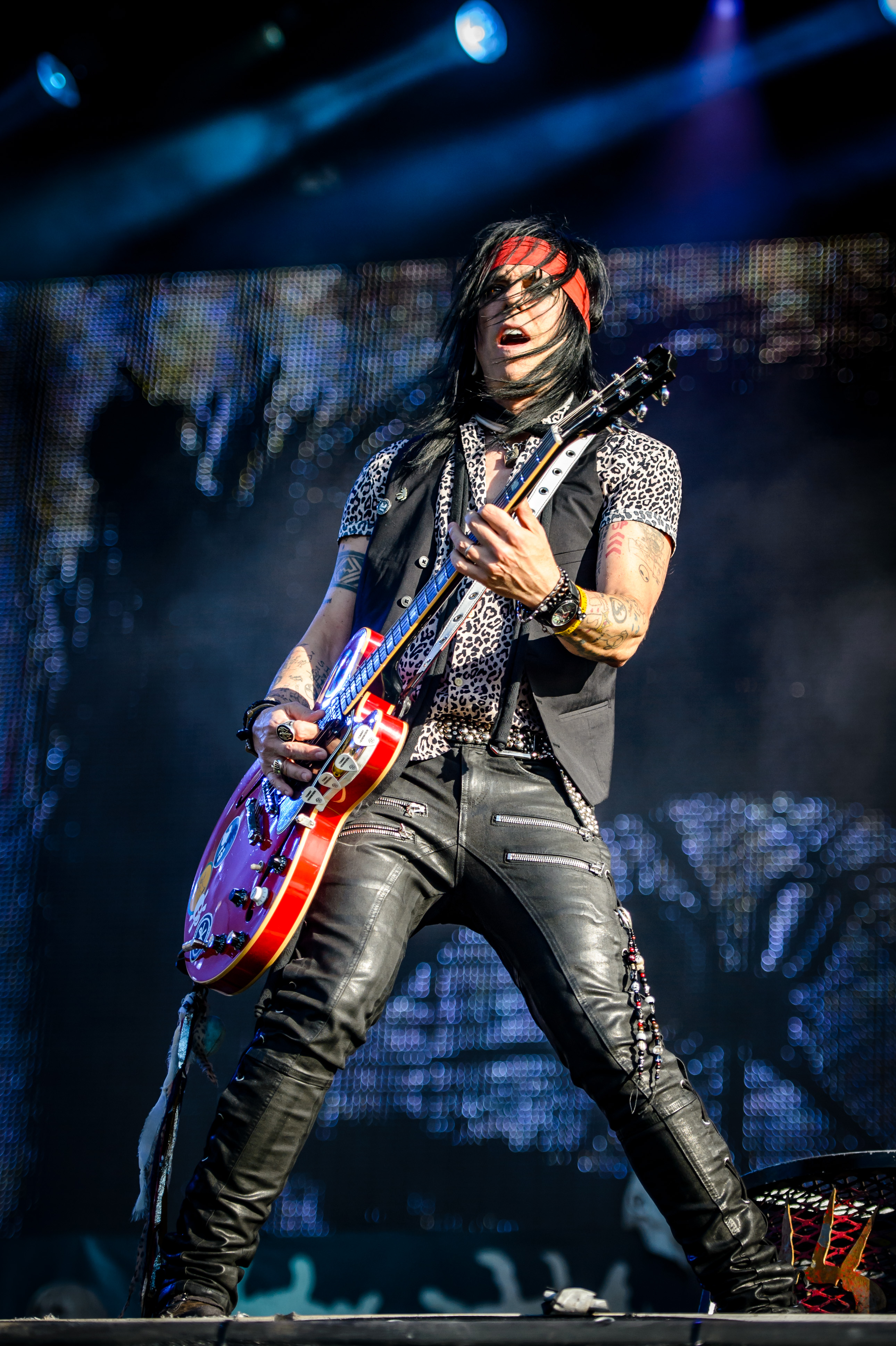
Henriksen with Alice Cooper in 2017

In March 2011, while being associate producer, guitar player, bass player, programmer, mixer and engineer on the new Alice Cooper Welcome 2 My Nightmare record, Alice asked Henriksen to play guitar in his live band, which Henriksen continues to be a member of. He can also be seen playing bass guitar in the "Heaven in This Hell" video by fellow Cooper bandmate Orianthi.

On October 31, 2014, Henriksen released the digital single "Give'm Hell" off his solo album Tommy! Tommy!! Tommy!!!, out on the Blue Martin/K-tel label in Switzerland, Germany and Austria. A promotional video for "Give 'Em Hell" was shot around Zurich, Switzerland. A limited edition vinyl version of the album was released in 2015 on Bellyache Records.

Henriksen is also a member of the Cooper-fronted rock supergroup Hollywood Vampires, appearing on the band's eponymous 2015 debut studio album and playing rhythm guitar at the band's Rock in Rio show on September 24, 2015, as well as warm-up shows at The Roxy on September 16 and 17. Henriksen played with the Hollywood Vampires during their February 2016 Grammy Award Performance.

In March 2017, Henriksen digitally released his latest solo album, StarStruck, on his own label Dis Vicious Music; a limited edition vinyl release followed in late May via Bellyache Records. Henriksen also had a significant role in the making of the Alice Cooper album, Paranormal, co-producing, playing guitar, and co-writing 3 songs.

Henriksen launched Crossbone Skully in December 2022 with Mutt Lange as executive producer, debuting with ''Evil World Machine''. Subsequent releases include ''The Boom Went the Boom'' (feat. Phil Collen), ''High On You'' (feat. Nikki Sixx), ''Everyone’s on Dope'', and ''I’m Unbreakable'', co-written with Lange. The next chapter, ''We’re L.O.S.T. (Lost Outcast Stronger Together)'', drops February 27, 2026, giving the final blow to the ''Evil World Machine'' saga.

== Discography ==
- 1984 Ruffkut – Fight for the Right
- 1987 Warlock – Triumph and Agony
- 1989 Doro – Force Majeure
- 1993 War & Peace – Time Capsule
- 1993 George Lynch – Sacred Groove
- 1995 P.O.L. – s/t
- 1996 P.O.L. – Sprockett
- 1999 Tommy Henriksen – s/t
- 2000 Tommy Henriksen – Selected Songs for a New Beginning
- 2002 Underground Moon – s/t
- 2003 Boink! – Walk of Fame EP
- 2011 Tommy Henriksen – Bluto Nero
- 2011 Alice Cooper – Welcome 2 My Nightmare
- 2014 Tommy Henriksen – Tommy! Tommy!! Tommy!!!
- 2015 Hollywood Vampires – Hollywood Vampires
- 2017 Tommy Henriksen – StarStruck
- 2017 Alice Cooper – Paranormal
- 2019 Hollywood Vampires – Rise
- 2021 Alice Cooper – Detroit Stories
- 2023 Hollywood Vampires – Live In Rio
- 2023 Alice Cooper – Road
- 2024 Crossbone Skully - Evil World Machine
