= True as Steel (album) =

Studio album by Warlock
- Released: August 18, 1986
- Recorded: May–June 1986
- Studios: Country Lane Studios, Munich, Germany; Hammerton A Studios, Düsseldorf, Germany
- Genre: Heavy metal
- Length: 38:57
- Labels: Vertigo (Europe), Mercury (US)
- Producer: Henry Staroste

Warlock chronology
Hellbound (1985)	True as Steel (1986)	Triumph and Agony (1987)

Professional ratings
Review scores
Source	Rating
AllMusic	3/5 stars
Collector's Guide to Heavy Metal	8/10

True as Steel is the third studio album by German heavy metal band Warlock, released in 1986.

The EP Fight for Rock, which contained many songs from this album, was Warlock's first success outside of Europe, charting on the US Billboard Hot 100; the music video for the song "Fight for Rock" was aired on MTV's Headbangers Ball.

== Track listing ==
All lyrics are written by Doro Pesch and René Maué.

Side one
No.	Title	Music	Length
1.	"Mr. Gold"	Frank Rittel, Henry Staroste	3:33
2.	"Fight for Rock"	Niko Arvanitis, Staroste	3:06
3.	"Love in the Danger Zone"	Peter Szigeti, Staroste	4:09
4.	"Speed of Sound"	Arvanitis, Staroste	3:21
5.	"Midnite in China"	Arvanitis, Staroste	4:30

Side two
No.	Title	Music	Length
6.	"Vorwärts, All Right!"	Szigeti, Staroste	3:45
7.	"True as Steel"	Arvanitis, Staroste	3:20
8.	"Lady in a Rock 'n' Roll Hell"	Szigeti, Staroste	3:42
9.	"Love Song"	Staroste, Pesch	3:45
10.	"Igloo on the Moon (Reckless)"	Szigeti, Staroste	3:10
11.	"T.O.L." (instrumental)	Szigeti, Staroste	2:20

2011 CD edition bonus tracks
No.	Title	Music	Length
12.	"You Hurt My Soul (On and On)"	Pesch, Staroste	5:29
13.	"Turn It On"	Rittel, Staroste, Pesch	3:40
14.	"Evil"	Rudi Graf	2:57

== Personnel ==
=== Warlock ===
- Doro Pesch – vocals
- Niko Arvanitis – guitar
- Peter Szigeti – guitar
- Frank Rittel – bass guitar
- Michael Eurich – drums

=== Production ===
- Henry Staroste – producer, mixing
- Rainer Assmann – engineer
- Garth Richardson – assistant engineer
- Michael Wagener – mixing at Amigo Studios, Hollywood, California
- Mastered at Sterling Sound, New York
- Peter Zimmermann – management

== Charts ==
Chart (1986)	Peak position
German Albums (Offizielle Top 100)	18
