= Final Days: Anthems for the Apocalypse =

Greatest hits album by Plasmatics
- Released: Mar 5, 2002
- Recorded: 1980–1987
- Genre: Punk metal
- Length: 51:02
- Label: Gigasaurus Records

Plasmatics chronology
Put Your Love in Me: Love Songs for the Apocalypse (2002)	Final Days: Anthems for the Apocalypse (2002)

Professional ratings
Review scores
Source	Rating
AllMusic	4/5 stars

Final Days: Anthems for the Apocalypse is the second greatest hits album by punk-metal band The Plasmatics, and the band's final release. It was released through Gigasarus Records in 2002. Like its predecessor, Put Your Love in Me: Love Songs for the Apocalypse, Final Days: Anthems for the Apocalypse contains track from Wendy O. Williams' solo career.

== Track listing ==
No.	Title	Writer(s)	Original album	Length
1.	"The Doom Song"	Wes Beech; Rod Swenson	Metal Priestess	5:23
2.	"Stop"	Beech; Swenson	Coup de Grace	4:33
3.	"Brain Dead"	Michael Ray; Swenson	Maggots: The Record	2:35
4.	"Masterplan"	Richie Stotts; Swenson	Beyond the Valley of 1984	3:11
5.	"Just Like on TV"	Beech; Swenson	Coup de Grace	4:04
6.	"Propagators"	Beech; Swenson	Maggots: The Record	3:02
7.	""Uniformed Guards""	Richie Stotts; Swenson	Coup de Grace	4:07
8.	"Opus in Cm7"	Chris Romanelli; Swenson	WOW	4:18
9.	"Lies"	Beech; Swenson	Deffest! and Baddest!	3:20
10.	"The Damned"	Romanelli; Swenson	Coup de Grace	3:52
11.	"A Pig is a Pig"	Jean Beauvoir; Stotts	Beyond the Valley of 1984	4:56
12.	"12 Noon"	Stotts; Swenson	Metal Priestess	3:33
13.	"Finale"	Beech; Ray; Swenson	Maggots: The Record	4:09
Total length:				51:02
