= Put Your Love in Me: Love Songs for the Apocalypse =

Compilation album by Plasmatics
- Released: March 5, 2002
- Recorded: 1980–1988
- Genre: Punk metal, punk rock
- Length: 39:57
- Label: Plasmatics Media, Ltd
- Producer: Dan Hartman; Rod Swenson

Plasmatics chronology
| Coup de Grace (2000) | Put Your Love in Me: Love Songs for the Apocalypse (2002) | Final Days: Anthems for the Apocalypse (2002) |

Put Your Love in Me: Love Songs for the Apocalypse is the first greatest hits album released by punk/metal band The Plasmatics in 2002.

While titled a Plasmatics album, it also includes songs from Wendy O. Williams' solo career. One point of contention is that these songs are still Plasmatics songs as they still feature the two main members of the band, Wendy and Wes Beech. The album contains tracks from all of the bands and Wendy's solo records, except for Coup d'Etat, with half of the songs coming from Wendy's WOW albums.

== Track listing ==
| No. | Title | Original album | Length |
|---|---|---|---|
| 1. | "Fuck That Booty" | Kommander of Kaos | 3:32 |
| 2. | "Put Your Love in Me" | Coup de Grace | 4:13 |
| 3. | "Fast Food Service" | New Hope for the Wretched | 1:24 |
| 4. | "Bump and Grind" | WOW | 4:25 |
| 5. | "Sex Junkie" | Beyond the Valley of 1984 | 3:08 |
| 6. | "Black Leather Monster" | Metal Priestess | 3:42 |
| 7. | "Jailbait" | Kommander of Kaos | 3:25 |
| 8. | "Party" | Kommander of Kaos | 3:38 |
| 9. | "I Love Sex (And Rock and Roll)" | WOW | 3:50 |
| 10. | "Dream Lover" | New Hope for the Wretched | 5:43 |
| 11. | "The Humpty Song" | Deffest! and Baddest! | 2:57 |
| Total length: | | | 39:57 |
