= Reform School Girls (soundtrack) =

Soundtrack album to the film Reform School Girls
- Released: 1986
- Genre: Hard rock; heavy metal
- Label: Rhino
- Producer: Martin Schwartz; Rod Swenson

Reform School Girls is the soundtrack album for the 1986 film of the same name. It was released in 1986 by Rhino Records. The soundtrack features mostly hard rock and heavy metal songs. Wendy O. Williams contributed four songs to the soundtrack; "It's My Life" from her debut studio album WOW (1984), "Bad Girl" and "Goin' Wild" from her second album Kommander of Kaos (1986), and the title song "Reform School Girls" recorded for the film. Williams herself appears in the film as a reform school bully Charlie Chamblis. Other artists on the album, consisting only of female singers and bands, include Etta James, Girlschool, Screamin' Sirens and Girl's Night Out.

== Track listing ==
No.	Title	Writer(s)	Artist(s)	Length
1.	"Reform School Girls"	Bobby Paine; Larson Paine	Wendy O. Williams
2.	"So Young, So Bad, So What"	B. Paine; L. Paine	Etta James
3.	"Bad Girl"	Jeff Loud; Rod Swenson; Wes Beech	Wendy O. Williams
4.	"Goin Wild"	Swenson; Michael Ray	Wendy O. Williams
5.	"Nowhere to Run"	Cris Bonacci; Jackie Bodimead; Kim McAuliffe	Girlschool
6.	"Love Slave"	Pleasant Gehman; Rosie Flores	Screamin' Sirens
7.	"Crime of the Heart"	Didi Stewart	Girl's Night Out
8.	"It's My Life"	Gene Simmons; Paul Stanley	Wendy O. Williams
