= Fight (Doro album) =

Studio album by Doro
- Released: 19 August 2002
- Studios: Soundmine Recording Studios, Stroudsburg, Pennsylvania; Atom H Studios, Düsseldorf, Germany
- Genre: Heavy metal
- Length: 54:34
- Label: SPV/Steamhammer
- Producers: Doro Pesch, Don Malsch, Chris Lietz

Doro chronology
Calling the Wild (2000)	Fight (2002)	Let Love Rain on Me (2004)

Singles from Fight
- 1. "Fight (mixes) / Fight by Your Side / Toujours pour Garder" Released: 19 August 2002

Professional ratings
Review scores
Source	Rating
AllMusic	4/5 stars
Metal Hammer (GER)	4/7 stars

Fight is the eighth studio album of the German female heavy metal singer Doro Pesch. It was released worldwide in 2002 by SPV/Steamhammer.

Fight is the first Doro album since Force Majeure to be produced with a strong contribution from the members of the band that accompanied the German singer on her tours. Nick Douglas, Joe Taylor and Johnny Dee had toured with Doro for more than ten years, while Oliver Palotai replaced Mario Parillo after his death in 2001.

The songs of the album are the usual mix of aggressive metal and soft ballads, with a distinctive rawer sound than in previous albums. At this time Doro tried some versions of the songs in languages different form English or German. What remains of these recordings are the chorus of "Salvaje" in Spanish and the chorus of the single's b-side "Tourjour pour Gasner" in French. The list of musicians sees the contribution of various guests: Type O Negative vocalist Peter Steele, Savatage guitarist Chris Caffery, former Plasmatics bassist Jean Beauvoir, veteran composer Russ Ballard and usual collaborators Chris Lietz, Jürgen Engler and Andreas Bruhn.

The title track was used by German boxer Regina Halmich to introduce her matches, while "Always Live to Win" became the official theme of Rhein Fire NFL Europe football team. "Legends Never Die" is a cover of a song performed by Wendy O. Williams on her album WOW of 1984.

The album was re-released on CD and vinyl on 25 January 2010 by SPV/Steamhammer with some bonus tracks. The extensive booklet includes new photos and liner notes by Doro Pesch and Nick Douglas.

Fight peaked at position No. 18 in the German Longplay chart.

== Track listing ==
No.	Title	Writer(s)	Length
1.	"Fight"	Joe Taylor, Nick Douglas, Doro Pesch, Johnny Dee	4:09
2.	"Always Live to Win"	Pesch, Chris Lietz	3:01
3.	"Descent"	Taylor, Pesch	4:02
4.	"Salvaje" ("Wild")	Jean Beauvoir, Pesch	2:47
5.	"Undying"	Pesch, Gary Scruggs	4:06
6.	"Legends Never Die" (Wendy O. Williams cover)	Micki Free, Adam Mitchell, Gene Simmons	5:21
7.	"Rock Before We Bleed"	Pesch, Lietz	4:22
8.	"Sister Darkness"	Beauvoir, Taylor, Pesch, Douglas, Dee	4:46
9.	"Wild Heart"	Russ Ballard, Pesch, Chris Winter	4:32
10.	"Fight by Your Side"	Pesch, Scruggs	3:49
11.	"Chained"	Pesch, Scruggs	4:15
12.	"Hoffnung (Hope)"	Andreas Bruhn, Pesch, Heike Jäger	4:37
13.	"Song for Me" (Digipak edition bonus track)	Scruggs	4:31
Total length:			54:34

2010 edition bonus tracks
No.	Title	Length
13.	"Song for Me"
14.	"Untouchable"
15.	"Tourjour pour Gasner ('Always live to Win')"
16.	"Always Live to Win" (acoustic)
17.	"Breaking the Law" (acoustic)

Note

Digipak edition has "Fight" and "Always Live to Win" music videos.

== Personnel ==
=== Band members ===
- Doro Pesch – vocals, producer
- Nick Douglas – bass, keyboards, backing vocals
- Joe Taylor – guitars, backing vocals
- Johnny Dee – drums, backing vocals
- Oliver Palotai – keyboards, guitars, backing vocals

=== Additional musicians ===
- Russ Ballard – guitar on "Wild Heart"
- Jean Beauvoir – guitar on "Sister Darkness"
- Andreas Bruhn – guitars on "Legends Never Die"
- Chris Caffery – guitars on "Salvaje" and guitar solo on "Descent"
- Jürgen Engler – ebow on "Legends Never Die"
- Chris Lietz – guitars, bass, keyboards, producer, engineer, mixing
- Peter Steele – vocals on "Descent"
- Michael Voss – guitar on "Legends Never Die"
- Chris Winter – keyboards on "Wild Heart"

=== Production ===
- Kai Blankenberg – mastering
- Dan Malsch – producer, engineer, mixing
- Joe West – engineer

== Charts ==
Chart (2002)	Peak position
German Albums (Offizielle Top 100)	18
Swiss Albums (Schweizer Hitparade)	100
