= Coup de Grace (Plasmatics album) =

Coup De Grace

Studio album by Plasmatics
- Released: 2002
- Recorded: 1982
- Genre: Punk metal
- Length: 47:09
- Label: Gigasaurus
- Producer: Dan Hartman; Rod Swenson

Plasmatics chronology
Maggots: The Record (1987)	Coup De Grace (2002)	Put Your Love in Me: Love Songs for the Apocalypse (2002)

Professional ratings
Review scores
Source	Rating
Allmusic	3/5 stars

Coup de Grace is a posthumous release by punk / metal band The Plasmatics in 2002. The album is the original demo of the album Coup d'Etat.

During the spring of 1982, the Plasmatics were signed to Capitol Records and Dan Hartman offered to produce a demo of the album for Capitol with Rod at Electric Lady Studios, Jimi Hendrix's old studio, in NY. The whole album was arranged, recorded and mixed within a week. Dieter Dierks, who had just come off a number one album with the Scorpions, also expressed interest in producing. Dan Hartman was soon replaced by Dieter.

The Hartman demo was released in 2002 under the name "Coup de Grace". This rawer version of Coup d'Etat took less than a tenth of the time and a fraction of the budget of the original.

== Track listing ==
1. "Put Your Love in Me" (Stotts, Swenson) - 4:13
2. "Stop" (Beech, Swenson) - 4:34
3. "Rock 'n' Roll" (Stotts, Swenson) - 3:58
4. "Just Like on TV" (Beech, Swenson) - 4:04
5. "Uniformed Guards" (Stotts, Swenson) - 4:27
6. "No Class" (Clarke, Kilmister, Taylor) - 2:09
7. "Mistress of Passion" (Stotts, Swenson) - 3:43
8. "Lightning Breaks" (Beech, Swenson) - 3:42
9. "Path of Glory" (Stotts, Swenson) - 5:00
10. "Country Fairs" (Stotts, Swenson) - 4:08
11. "The Damned" (Romanelli, Swenson) - 3:54

== Personnel ==
- Wendy O. Williams – vocals
- Richie Stotts – lead guitar
- Wes Beech – rhythm guitar
- Chris Romanelli – bass, keyboards
- Joey Reese – drums

== Reception ==
Reception to the album is generally positive. Many fans of the band have stated that this version is the one they prefer due to its rawness.
