= Final Days =

Final Days or The Final Days may refer to:

- The Final Days, a 1976 book by Bob Woodward and Carl Bernstein
- The Final Days (1989 film), a television movie adaptation of the book
- The Final Days (2000 film), a short film produced by the White House
- Thatcher: The Final Days, a 1991 film about Margaret Thatcher
- Final Days (2023 film), an online anti-vaccine propaganda film
- "Final Days", a song from DC Talk
- "Final Days", a song by Jonathan Davis from Black Labyrinth
- Final Days: Anthems for the Apocalypse, an album by The Plasmatics
