= Put Your Love In Me =

Put Your Love in Me may refer to:

- A 1977 hit single by Hot Chocolate
- Put Your Love in Me: Love Songs for the Apocalypse, an album by The Plasmatics
