= New Hope for the Wretched =

Studio album by Plasmatics
- Released: October 2, 1980
- Recorded: 1980
- Genre: Punk rock; heavy metal
- Length: 34:26
- Label: Stiff
- Producer: Jimmy Miller; Ed Stasium; Rod Swenson

Plasmatics chronology
New Hope for the Wretched (1980)	Beyond the Valley of 1984 (1981)

Singles from New Hope for the Wretched
- 1. "Butcher Baby" Released: June 27, 1980; 2. "Monkey Suit" Released: September 5, 1980

Professional ratings
Review scores
Source	Rating
AllMusic	2.5/5 stars
Rolling Stone	1/5 stars

New Hope for the Wretched is the debut studio album by American punk rock band Plasmatics. It was released on October 2, 1980, by Stiff Records.

Jimmy Miller, former producer of the Rolling Stones and Motörhead (a band Plasmatics would collaborate with in the future), was the initial producer for the album. He had a heroin addiction from the day he arrived in New York City and he was virtually useless to the project, nearly bringing the whole project down with him. Stiff Records fired Miller, and the album was finished by engineer Ed Stasium and manager Rod Swenson over in England. In addition to songs like "Corruption" and "Living Dead", linked to TV smashing and automobile destruction, the song "Butcher Baby" featured, as with the live shows, a chainsaw sawing through a guitar in place of a guitar solo. Stiff released it as single and it peaked at No. 55 on the UK Singles Chart, with the album reaching the same position on the UK Albums Chart.

The liner notes for the record proudly proclaimed that during the recording of the cover of "Dream Lover" (originally by Bobby Darin) the musicians were isolated from each other while recording and, during the instrumental break, could not hear what each other were playing.

The album was re-released in 2001 by Plasmatics Media, Inc. with bonus tracks and the Metal Priestess EP on the same disc. In 2002, Cherry Red Records re-released the complete album. In 2014, Let Them Eat Viny] re-released the album (including the 2002 CD bonus tracks) as two coloured discs.

== Reception ==
New Hope for the Wretched would become the Plasmatics' most successful album, charting for 10 weeks and peaking at 134 on the Billboard 200 in 1981, a few months before the release of their follow-up album, Beyond the Valley of 1984. The album proved a bigger success in the U.K., peaking at 55 in November 1980.

== Track listing ==
No.	Title	Writer(s)	Length
1.	"Tight Black Pants"	Rod Swenson; Richie Stotts	1:44
2.	"Monkey Suit"	Swenson; Wes Beech	3:19
3.	"Living Dead"	Swenson; Stotts	1:31
4.	"Test Tube Babies"	Swenson; Stotts	1:51
5.	"Won't You"	Swenson; Stotts	2:25
6.	"Concrete Shoes"	Swenson; Chosei Funahara	2:52
7.	"Squirm" (Live)	Swenson; Beech	3:29
8.	"Want You Baby"	Swenson; Stotts	1:53
9.	"Dream Lover"	Bobby Darin	5:35
10.	"Sometimes I"	Swenson; Stotts	3:51
11.	"Corruption"	Swenson; Stotts	2:36
12.	"Butcher Baby"	Swenson; Stotts	3:20
Total length:			34:26

New Hope for the Wretched / Metal Priestess – 2001 CD reissue bonus tracks
No.	Title	Writer(s)	Length
13.	"Tight Black Pants" (Live)		1:56
14.	"Living Dead" (Live)		3:52
15.	"Sometimes I" (Live)		3:55
16.	"Lunacy"	Swenson; Stotts	5:08
17.	"Doom Song"	Swenson; Beech	5:22
18.	"Sex Junkie" (Live)	Swenson; Stotts; Beech	3:08
19.	"Black Leather Monster"	Swenson; Beech	3:41
20.	"12 Noon"	Swenson; Stotts	3:30
21.	"Masterplan" (Live)	Swenson; Stotts	4:48

New Hope for the Wretched – 2002 CD reissue bonus tracks
No.	Title	Length
13.	"Sometimes I" (Live)	3:55
14.	"Living Dead" (Live)	3:52
15.	"Tight Black Pants" (Live)	1:56
16.	"Butcher Baby" (Live)	3:32
17.	"Corruption" (Live)	2:39
18.	"You Think You're Comin'"	1:50
19.	"Fast Food Service"	2:39

== Personnel ==
Plasmatics

- Wendy O. Williams – vocals, saxophone, chainsaw, machine gun
- Richie Stotts – lead guitar
- Wes Beech – rhythm guitar
- Jean Beauvoir – bass guitar
- Stu Deutsch – drums, synthdrums

Production

- Jimmy Miller – producer, percussion
- Ed Stasium – producer, engineer, mixing
- Rod Swenson – producer, management, mixing
- Trevor Hallsey – engineer

== Charts ==
Chart (1980)	Peak position
UK Albums (OCC)	55

Chart (1981)	Peak position
US Billboard 200	134
