= Pat Ast =

American actress and model (1941–2001)

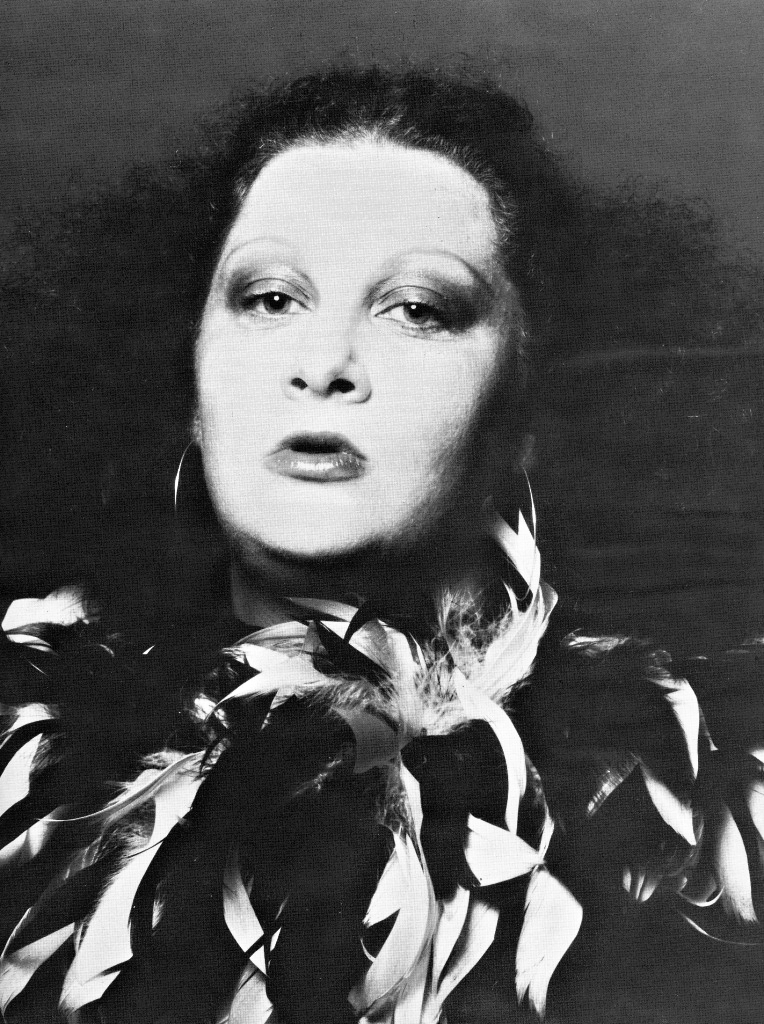
- Ast in 1972
- Born: Patricia Ann Ast; October 21, 1941; New York City, U.S.
- Died: October 2, 2001 (aged 59); Los Angeles, California, U.S.
- Resting place: Mount Sinai Memorial Park Cemetery
- Education: Erasmus Hall High School
- Occupations: Actress; model
- Years active: 1969–1993

Patricia Ann Ast (October 21, 1941 – October 2, 2001) was an American actress and model. She rose to fame as a Warhol superstar in the early 1970s, appearing in the film Heat (1972). Ast was a muse to fashion designer Halston and a member of his circle of models known as the Halstonettes. Ast challenged prevailing ideals of the fashion industry and became one of the earliest plus-size models to gain prominence on major designer runways. She later appeared in several films including The Duchess and the Dirtwater Fox (1976), Foul Play (1978), and Reform School Girls (1986).

== Early life ==
Patricia Ann Ast was born on October 21, 1941, in the Flatbush neighborhood of Brooklyn, New York, to Jewish parents Irwin and Rose (Ludwig) Ast. Her father was a onetime Borscht Belt comedian who later ran a paint store in the Bronx.

She attended Erasmus Hall High School in Prospect Lefferts Gardens, Brooklyn, where Barbra Streisand was a classmate.

Ast's weight became a source of contention within her family from adolescence. Ast experienced significant weight gain at age 15. She later lost approximately 50 pounds through dieting and other treatments, but her clothing size decreased only from 18 to 16. She subsequently decided to accept her body rather than continue trying to lose weight, saying, "I made up my mind to stay the way I am, and live with it." Her mother repeatedly encouraged her to lose weight and change her appearance, leading to frequent conflicts between them.

== Career ==
Ast had aspirations to become an actress, singer and model despite her day job as a receptionist at a box factory. She made her screen debut after meeting director John Schlesinger on Fire Island, who cast her in a walk-on role as a party guest in Midnight Cowboy (1969). She earned $112 for the role and her actors' union card.

Fashion designer Halston, whom Ast met in August 1970, was amused by her personality and offered her a job at his Madison Avenue boutique. Ast recalled that she and Halston "started giggling immediately, over nothing" and developed a close friendship. She began working for him in November 1970, assisting with clients that included Lauren Bacall, Jacqueline Kennedy Onassis, Marlo Thomas, and other prominent figures.

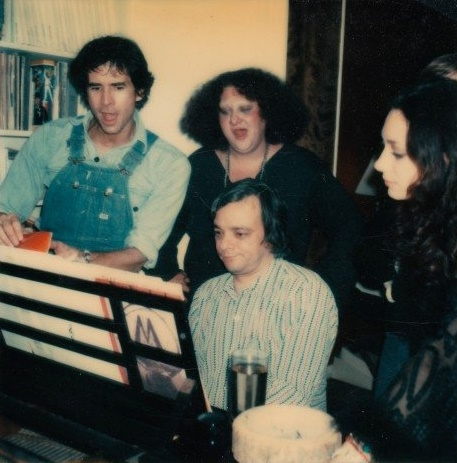
Ast behind Stephen Sondheim with Anthony Perkins (left) and Marisa Berenson (right), circa 1973

Halston subsequently asked Ast to model in one of his runway shows as a surprise to the fashion press. She attracted considerable press and became a feature of his shows, often modeling custom-made caftans and sashaying around with a fan. She appeared alongside models such as Elsa Peretti, Pat Cleveland, and Naomi Sims. Ast became a prominent member of Halston's entourage and one of his favored models, known collectively as the Halstonettes. Halston referred to her as his "lady-in-waiting," while Ast called him "the king" of fashion.

In 1971, Pop artist Andy Warhol called Ast and invited her to appear in one of his films, asking if she could be ready in ten days. She subsequently traveled to California to film Heat (1972), her first major film role. Ast recalled that she had previously traveled only to New Orleans and Las Vegas, describing her first trip to California as "like going into space." Her work with Warhol brought her wider attention and placed her among the group of performers and personalities associated with the Factory known as the Warhol superstars.

Ast modeled designs by Stephen Burrows and Giorgio di Sant'Angelo, and she was photographed by Francesco Scavullo. By 1972, Ast commanded $500 a day for modeling-photography or $75 an hour. During the 1972 Coty Awards at Lincoln Center, she closed Halston's presentation by emerging from a giant cake singing "Happy Birthday to Me."

In 1975, Ast moved to Los Angeles to pursue a career in Hollywood. She appeared in films including The Duchess and the Dirtwater Fox (1976), Foul Play (1978), and The Pursuit of D. B. Cooper (1981), in which she had a cameo alongside Robert Duvall. She later had one of her most notable roles as the sadistic warden in Reform School Girls (1986). Despite these appearances, Ast never achieved the level of mainstream fame she had hoped for. Bob Colacello, a former editor of Interview and Warhol's aide, later observed that, like many Warhol actors, "they had a brief run of fame that didn't lead anywhere."

Ast remained deeply attached to New York and when her career stalled in Los Angeles, she returned to New York in the early 1980s. In 1982, Ast was cast as La Saraghina, the tambourine-playing temptress, in the original Broadway production of Nine, based on Federico Fellini's film 8 1/2. However, director Tommy Tune dismissed her from the production three months into rehearsals.

== Later life and Illness ==
Ast returned to Los Angeles, where she occasionally worked on films made by friends and resumed her friendship with photographer Berry Berenson, who lived there with her husband, actor Anthony Perkins, and their children, Osgood and Elvis. Ast became particularly close to the family and regarded Berenson's children as her own. She increasingly relied on Berenson following the deaths of Bob Young, whom Ast described as the "love of her life," and Halston, both of whom died from AIDS-related complications.

In her later years, Ast's diabetes worsened and resulted in the amputation of several toes, leaving her unable to drive and increasingly dependent on friends for transportation. Ast was deeply affected by Berenson's death aboard American Airlines Flight 11 during the September 11 attacks in 2001. At the time, Berenson had been secretly organizing Ast's friends to bring her to New York for the launch of a new book about Halston, which coincided with Ast's 60th birthday on October 21.

== Death ==
Ast was found dead at her home in West Hollywood, California on October 2, 2001. Neighbors became concerned after noticing newspapers accumulating outside her door and realizing that she had not been seen walking her dogs for several days. A friend was contacted and found Ast dead in her bed. Her death was reported as being from natural causes. Two memorial services were held because of scheduling conflicts among attendees. Among those who attended were Richard Benjamin, Paula Prentiss, Bud Cort, Paul Reubens, and Holly Woodlawn. Ast was buried at Mount Sinai Memorial Park Cemetery in Hollywood Hills.

== Public image and legacy ==
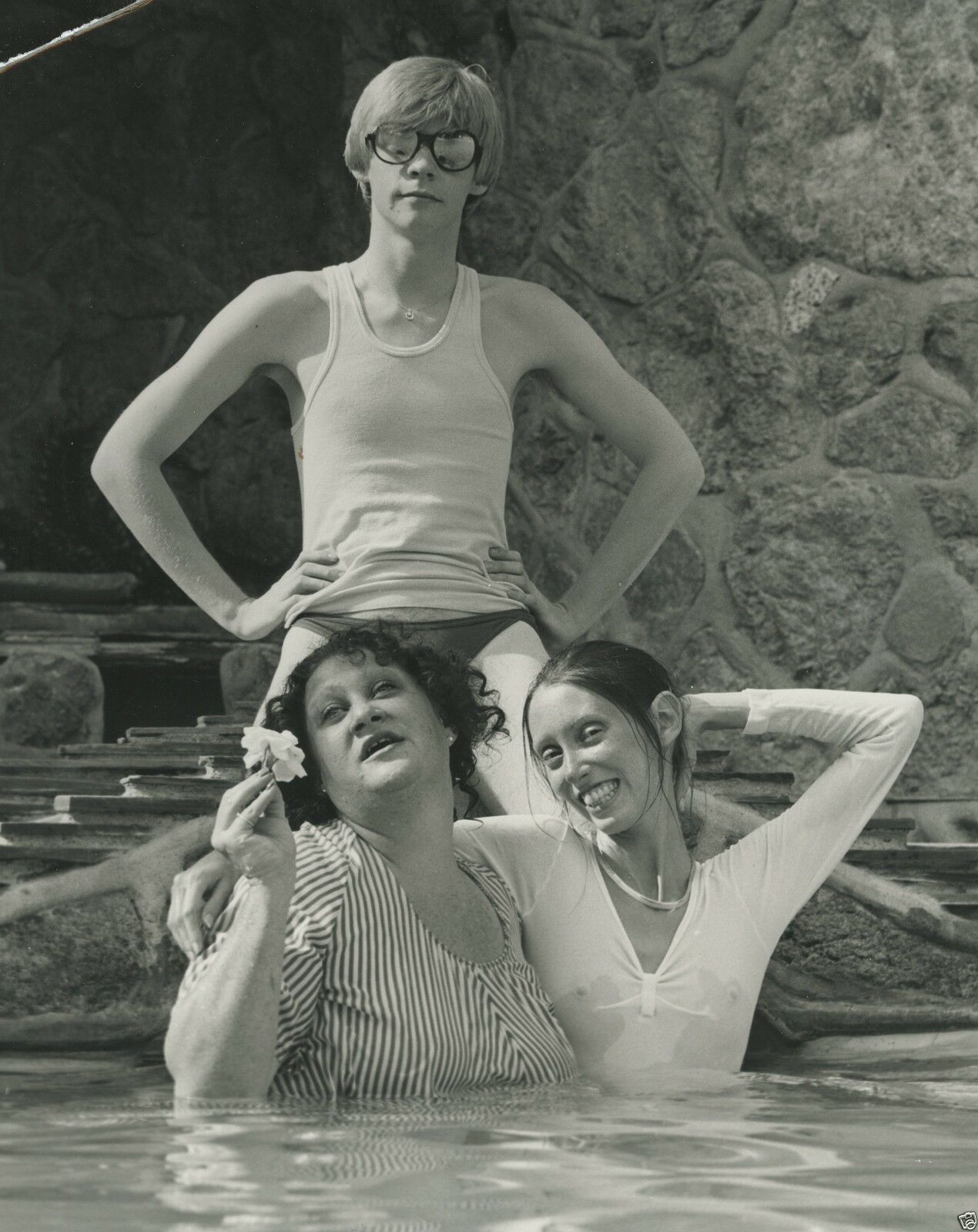
Ast (left) with Dennis Christopher and Shelley Duvall in 1975

Ast's combination of fashion, performance, and boisterous personality subsequently became an important part of her public image. She was affectionately dubbed "The SuperAst." Her unconventional appearance made her a favorite among fashion designers, although her size made her unusual in an industry with few models representing larger women. Despite her visibility on the runway, she was often treated as a novelty rather than a serious model by the press.

Los Angeles Times fashion editor Marylou Luther described Ast as coming "off like a Kate Smith in fashion drag." When asked whether Halston was exploiting her, Ast rejected the suggestion. In her syndicated Clotheslines column, Marylou responded to a size 16 reader who noted that Halston, Giorgio di Sant'Angelo, and Stephen Burrows offered clothing only in sizes 12 or 14 and asked whether they were expanding their size ranges since they used Ast as a model. Luther replied, "It's a put-on," explaining that the 210-pound Ast was a friend of all three designers and that the clothes she modeled had been made especially for her. Other contemporary coverage was more openly derisive. Kathy Hoersten of the Journal Herald called Ast "the ultimate departure from the high fashion figure," while Pittsburgh Post-Gazette writer Judy Ludlum questioned whether Halston was "thumbing his nose at the whole fashion industry."

Ast herself rejected the idea that her size diminished her legitimacy as a model. She said her primary aim was to make people smile. In an interview reported by The Boston Globe, Ast said, "Rolls of fat have nothing to do with confidence. You've got to make everything you've got work despite the standards imposed by society." Her runway appearances and her love scene in Heat, and the attention they generated, challenged conventional ideals of the female body and the prevailing image of the sex symbol.

In retrospect, Ast has increasingly been recognized as a trailblazer in fashion and one of the earliest plus-size models to achieve prominence on major designer runways. In 2002, The New York Times called Ast " the original superdupermodel," while W hailed her in 2021 as a "pioneering" muse.

== In pop culture ==
Ast was portrayed by Shawna Hamic in the 2021 Netflix miniseries Halston.

== Filmography ==
Year	Title	Role	Notes
1969	Midnight Cowboy	Party Guest	Uncredited
1970	The Sidelong Glances of a Pigeon Kicker	Fat Girl at Party	Uncredited
1972	The Possession of Joel Delaney	Mental Hospital Patient	Uncredited
1972	Heat	Lydia	
1976	The Duchess and the Dirtwater Fox	Music Hall Singer	
1976	Six Characters in Search of an Author	Madam Pace	TV movie
1977	Which Way Is Up?	Hooker	
1977	The World's Greatest Lover	Bakery / Wardrobe Lady	
1978	Foul Play	Mrs. Venus	
1978	The Users	The Dressmaker	TV movie
1979	Amateur Night at the Dixie Bar and Grill	Vera Elvira	TV movie
1981	The Incredible Shrinking Woman	Customer #1	
1981	The Pursuit of D. B. Cooper	Horse Lady	
1982	Pandemonium	Bus Driver	
1986	Club Life	Butch	
1986	Slow Burn		TV movie
1986	Reform School Girls	Edna	
1989	Homer and Eddie	Maggie Sinclair	
1991	Ted & Venus	Women's Group #2	
1992	Loving Lulu		
1995	Beauville		short
