= Coup d'Etat (Plasmatics album) =

Studio album by Plasmatics
- Released: October 8, 1982
- Recorded: Dierks Studios, Cologne, Germany, 1982
- Genre: Punk rock; hardcore punk; heavy metal
- Length: 38:48 (52:43 with bonus tracks included)
- Label: Capitol
- Producer: Dieter Dierks

Plasmatics chronology
Metal Priestess (1981)	Coup d'Etat (1982)	Maggots: The Record (1987)

Coup d'Etat is the third studio album released by punk rock band The Plasmatics on October 8, 1982 through Capitol Records, which was their only album to be released through that label.

== Background ==
In 1982, a deal was signed with Capitol Records and Dan Hartman offered to produce a demo of the album for Capitol with Rod Swenson at Electric Lady Studios, Jimi Hendrix's old studio, in New York. A demo was arranged, recorded and mixed within a week, but not released. It would be released 20 years later as Coup de Grace.

== Recording ==
The album was recorded at Dierks Studios, near Cologne, Germany and was produced by Dieter Dierks, who had just come off a number one album with the Scorpions.

Coup d'Etat was a breakthrough album that began to blend the punk and heavy metal genres, something that would later be done by bands such as S.O.D., Anthrax, and the Cro-Mags by the end of the 1980s. Singer Wendy O. Williams also broke ground for her unique singing style; she pushed her voice so hard she had to travel into Cologne each day for treatment to avoid permanent damage to her vocal cords.

== Release ==
Despite the band's rise in fame, they were dropped by Capitol Records shortly after the album's release when sales proved less than hoped for and their stage shows, which often featured Williams destroying tables, chairs, and other home furnishings with a chainsaw, created considerable controversy.

In 2005, Rock Candy Records re-released the album with expanded liner notes, bonus tracks, and a re-master of the entire original album.

== Reception ==
Professional ratings
Review scores
Source	Rating
AllMusic	3/5 stars
Robert Christgau	D-

The Los Angeles Times called Coup d'Etat the "best slice of unrelenting heavy metal since the last AC/DC album", adding, "Williams makes Ann Wilson or Pat Benatar sound like Judy Collins". The newspaper's question about whether the heavy metal audience (predominantly male) would "accept a female screecher" underscored how groundbreaking Williams was. This was previously entirely male territory.

A review in Creem called it a "breakthrough" record and Williams "an aggressive female"; the review went on saying it was "kicking down traditional barriers". Williams' "physicality...is (now) coming out of her voice." The Creem review, by Cyril Blight, attacked the sexism of those who "can't handle" or "even resent the very idea of a woman like Wendy Williams singing rock and roll with ferocity-which is to say the same qualities they would applaud if they were coming from a man, providing there was a man around today with the balls to do that."

Consumer Guide critic Robert Christgau panned the album and Williams, noting "Not only can't she sing (ha) she can't even yell," and suggesting she "might well be advised to start singing with her nether lips".

J. D. Considine wrote in Musician: "Ever wonder what Black Sabbath would have sounded like with a chainsaw as lead singer?"

== Tour ==
In early 1983, as a part of the support for the album and an attempt to continue their transition toward a metal audience, the band opened for Kiss on their Creatures of the Night tour. It was during this time that Gene Simmons approached manager Rod Swenson about producing the next Plasmatics album (ultimately becoming the initial Wendy O. Williams solo offering, WOW).

== Covers ==
The song "The Damned" was covered by German thrash metal band Destruction on the Mad Butcher EP in 1987. During the 1990s, the music video was shown on Beavis and Butt-Head, in which the duo praised the song, the appearance of Williams, and the action stunts. The electro band Japanese Car Crash would perform "The Damned" live on their tours from 2007-2013. They replaced the guitar solo with a theremin solo.

== Track listing ==
Side one
No.	Title	Writer(s)	Length
1.	"Put Your Love in Me"	Richie Stotts, Rod Swenson	3:55
2.	"Stop"	Wes Beech, Swenson	4:40
3.	"Rock 'n' Roll"	Stotts, Swenson	4:23
4.	"Lightning Breaks"	Beech, Swenson	3:58
5.	"No Class"	Eddie Clarke, Lemmy Kilmister, Phil Taylor	2:36

Side two
No.	Title	Writer(s)	Length
1.	"Mistress of Taboo"	Stotts, Swenson	3:16
2.	"Country Fairs"	Beech, Swenson	3:37
3.	"Path of Glory"	Stotts, Swenson	4:45
4.	"Just Like on TV"	Beech, Swenson	3:17
5.	"The Damned"	Junior Romanelli, Swenson	4:21

2005 CD re-issue bonus tracks
No.	Title	Writer(s)	Length
1.	"Uniformed Guards (work-in-progress)"	Stotts, Swenson	4:07
2.	"Put Your Love in Me (demo)"	Stotts, Swenson	4:13
3.	"Stop (demo)"	Beech, Swenson	4:35
4.	"Coup D'Etat Radio Ad (previously unheard)"		1:00

== Personnel ==
=== Plasmatics ===
- Wendy O. Williams - vocals
- Richie Stotts - lead guitar
- Wes Beech - rhythm guitar
- Junior Romanelli - bass, keyboards
- T. C. Tolliver - drums, percussion

=== Production ===
- Dieter Dierks - producer
- Michael Wagener - engineer
- George Marino - mastering
