= Drums Along the Mohawk (album) =

Studio album by Jean Beauvoir
- Released: 1986
- Genre: Rock
- Label: Columbia
- Producer: Jean Beauvoir

Jean Beauvoir chronology
Drums Along the Mohawk (1986)	Jacknifed (1988)

Drums Along the Mohawk is the debut solo album by the American musician Jean Beauvoir, released in 1986. Its title was inspired by Beauvoir's hairstyle as well as the novel and film of the same name. Beauvoir supported the album by opening for the Eurythmics on a North American tour.

The first single was "Feel the Heat"; after viewing the video, Sylvester Stallone chose to use it as the theme song to his film Cobra. The second single was "Missing the Young Days". Drums Along the Mohawk peaked at No. 93 on the Billboard 200.

== Production ==
Beauvoir wrote and produced the songs and played most of the instruments; Mick Jones played guitar on one track. Many of the songs were written in Sweden, a frequent travel destination of Beauvoir's. Beauvoir spent six months working on the album, deciding after the basic tracks were completed to forgo using the session musicians that he had originally scheduled. "Rockin' in the Street" incorporates elements of reggae; Beauvoir uses spoken word vocals on "Nina".

== Critical reception ==
Professional ratings
Review scores
Source	Rating
AllMusic	3/5 stars
The Encyclopedia of Popular Music	2/5 stars
Omaha World-Herald	2.5/5 stars
Record-Journal	B−
The Windsor Star	B

Billboard highlighted the album as a "Pop Pick". It characterized it as a "splashy debut on this mostly self-contained pop/rock project." The magazine praised the musical direction, stating that it "expertly fuses classic rock and au courant techno-pop elements to showcase his passionate vocal style." "Feel the Heat" was highlighted as typifying Beauvoir's "vivid style", which the reviewer concluded "augurs mainstream attention."

The Chicago Sun-Times called the album "a richly textured collection of romantic urban anthems over street-beat rhythms." The Toronto Star labeled Beauvoir an "earnest, tradition-conscious stylist whose music welds R'n'B spunk to a romantic, rock-ballad backdrop." The Grand Forks Herald said that the album "has classic soul roots, but has applied them to modern synthesizer funk with distorted, pained, guitar solos."

The Hartford Courant opined that some of the songs "are too similar to the memory lanes better traveled by Springsteen and Prince." The Omaha World-Herald considered Drums Along the Mohawk to be "disappointingly bland... The lack of outside input is a prime weakness". Trouser Press stated that it was a "mainstream rock LP" that was influenced primarily by Prince; likewise, The Morning Call characterized it as "FM-rock-radio slop".

== Track listing ==
No.	Title	Length
1.	"Feel the Heat"
2.	"Never Went Down"
3.	"Missing the Young Days"
4.	"Rockin' in the Street"
5.	"Sorry I Missed Your Wedding Day"
6.	"Drive You Home"
7.	"Same Song Plays On and On"
8.	"This Is Our House"
9.	"If I Was Me"
10.	"Nina"
