= Michael Ray (guitarist) =

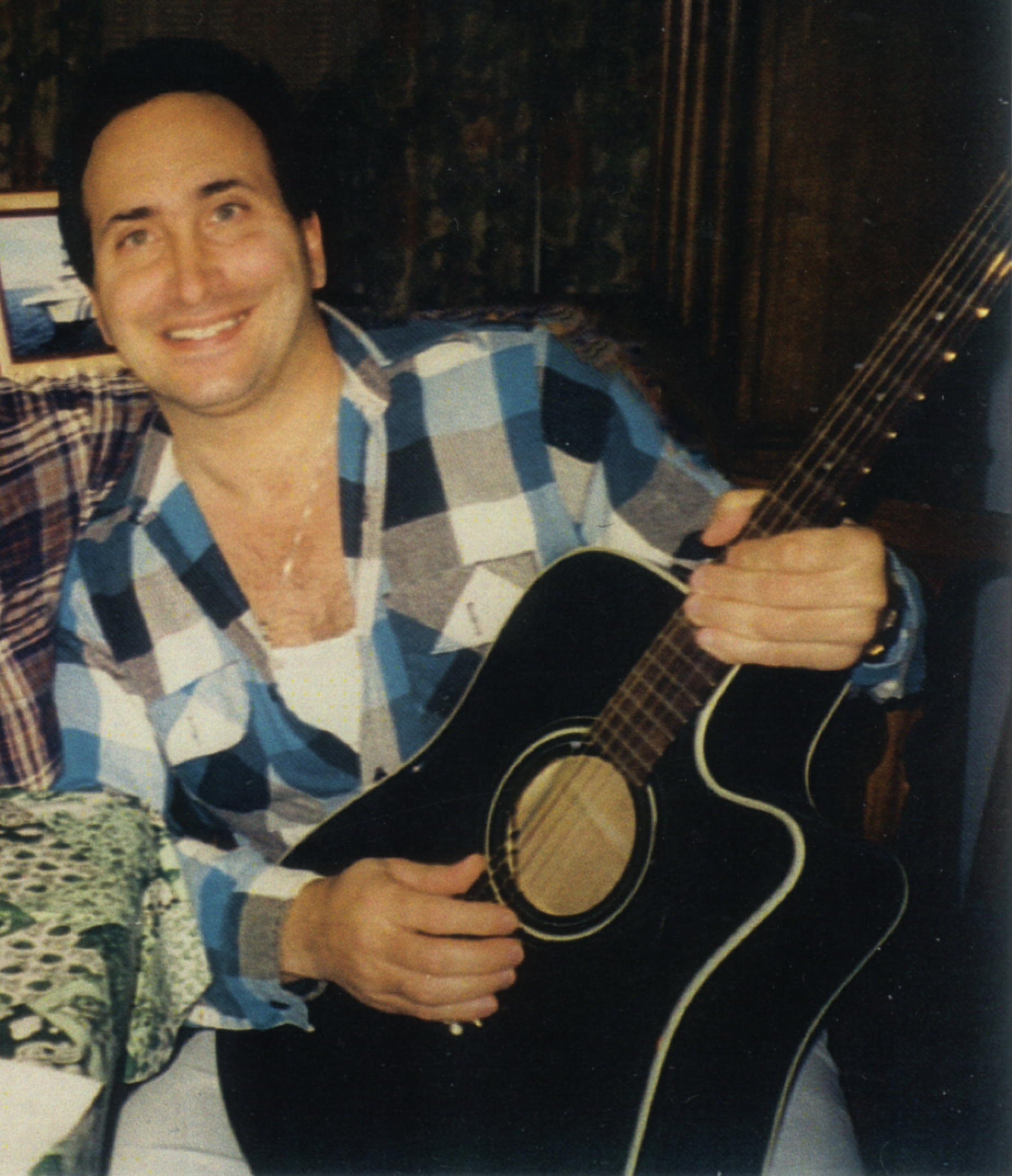

Background information
- Born: Michael Rea; April 4, 1960 (age 66); Woodhaven, Queens, New York, United States
- Genres: Alternative rock, hard rock, punk rock
- Occupations: Guitarist, musician, songwriter, producer
- Instrument: Guitar
- Years active: 1980–present

Michael Rea (born April 4, 1960) better known by his stage name Michael Ray or M. Ray, is an American guitarist, songwriter and record producer, who was a guitarist for the punk rock band Plasmatics and for fromwoman Wendy O. Williams' solo projects. He also worked with hard rock band Kiss and toured with the English rock band Motörhead.

== Early life ==
Ray was born in Queens, NY in 1960. He grew up in Woodhaven, New York and attended Beach Channel High School. He was discovered by Gene Simmons at My Father's Place, a club on Long Island in 1982 at the age of 22.

== Career ==
In the year 1982, Michael Ray auditioned for the band Kiss as the replacement of Ace Frehley. He recorded guitar solos for the album Creatures of the Night at Record Plant Studios, New York. Michael recorded as lead guitarist for the songs Keep me comin, Creatures of the Night, I Still Love You, and War Machine.

In 1983 after the departure of Vinnie Vincent, Michael played live with Kiss at Rocket Rehearsal Studios, New York for the Live Lick it up audition. He performed the songs Fits like a Glove, Gimme More, Exciter and Hells Breakin Loose.

In 1984, Michael recorded as lead guitarist for the Wendy O. Williams first solo album WOW, produced by Gene Simmons. He signed the management contract and the record was released on Passport Records. He also wrote songs for Wendy O. Williams second solo album Kommander of Kaos.

He appeared on The Joan Rivers Show in 1986 in Studio City, Los Angeles and performed two songs. In 1987, he collaborated music for the New World Pictures release of Reform School Girls.

Ray also wrote songs on the Plasmatics 9th Anniversary album, Maggots: The Record that was released on Profile Records in 1987. It was considered to be the biggest selling Plasmatics album to date.

== Discography ==
=== Vocals ===
- Wendy O. Williams / Plasmatics - Maggots: The Record (1987)
- Wendy O. Williams - Kommander Of Kaos (2000)

=== Instruments and performance ===
- Wendy O. Williams - WOW (1984)
- Wendy O. Williams - It's My Life (1984)
- Wendy O. Williams - Live (1985)
- Wendy O. Williams - Fuck N' Roll (1985)
- It's My Life - Reform School Girl (1986)
- Wendy O. Williams / Plasmatics - Maggots: The Record (1987)
- Wendy O. Williams - Kommander Of Kaos (2000)
- Wendy O. Williams - Bump 'N' Grind (2000)
- Sara Johnston - Trespassing (2011)
- Kiss - Gene Simmons Vault Disc One Track 6 solo on Legends Never Die (1982)

=== Writing and arrangement ===
- Goin Wild Various - Reform School Girls (1986)
- Wendy O. Williams / Plasmatics - Maggots: The Record (1987)
