= Metal Priestess =

EP by Plasmatics
- Released: October 21, 1981
- Recorded: 1981
- Studio: The Schoolhouse (Westport, Connecticut)
- Genre: Heavy metal; punk rock
- Length: 25:33
- Label: Stiff; PVC
- Producer: Dan Hartman; Rod Swenson

Plasmatics chronology
Beyond the Valley of 1984 (1981)	Metal Priestess (1981)	Coup d'Etat (1982)

Professional ratings
Review scores
Source	Rating
AllMusic	3/5 stars

Metal Priestess is the second extended play by American punk rock band Plasmatics. It was released on October 21, 1981 by Stiff Records and reissued the same year by PVC Records with an alternative cover.

Dan Hartman, who produced acts such as 38 Special and James Brown, among others, had been working on a session in LA when he picked up a copy of Beyond the Valley of 1984 and couldn't stop playing it. It was "ground breaking," he said. "I knew I wanted to meet these people and do something with them." Dan came down to the Tribeca loft where he met Wendy O. Williams and Rod Swenson and a month later he and Rod Swenson were working on the production of the Metal Priestess EP.

The creation of the EP is a result of the need to release something due to their increasing popularity, with an album being premature, partly because Capitol Records was now making overtures for the next one. Metal Priestess was recorded at Dan's private studio off his schoolhouse turned home and studio in Connecticut and released early in the fall of 1981.

In 2002, the EP was re-released through Plasmatics Media, LTD on the New Hope for the Wretched re-release.

== Track listing ==
No.	Title	Writer(s)	Length
1.	"Lunacy"	Richie Stotts; Rod Swenson	5:04
2.	"Doom Song"	Wes Beech; Swenson	5:23
3.	"Sex Junkie" (Live)	Stotts; Beech; Swenson	3:08
4.	"Black Leather Monster"	Beech; Swenson	3:39
5.	"12 Noon"	Stotts; Swenson	3:31
6.	"Masterplan" (Live)	Stotts; Swenson	4:48
Total length:			25:33

== Personnel ==
Credits adapted from the album's liner notes.

Plasmatics

- Wendy O. Williams – vocals
- Richie Stotts – lead guitar
- Wes Beech – rhythm guitar
- Chris Romanelli – bass guitar
- Joey Reese – drums
- Jean Beauvoir – bass guitar, keyboards (on "Sex Junkie" and "Masterplan")
- Tony Petri – drums (on "Sex Junkie" and "Masterplan")

Production

- Dan Hartman – producer, engineer
- Rod Swenson – producer, concept, management
- Eddie Ciletti – engineer (on "Sex Junkie" and "Masterplan")
- Ted Jensen – mastering

Packaging

- Rod Swenson – photography (as Butch Star)
- Leslie Cabarga – cover art
