= Beyond the Valley of 1984 =

Studio album by Plasmatics
- Released: May 1981
- Recorded: 1981
- Studio: The Ranch (New York City)
- Genre: Punk rock; heavy metal
- Length: 42:09
- Label: Stiff
- Producer: Rod Swenson; Plasmatics

Plasmatics chronology
New Hope for the Wretched (1980)	Beyond the Valley of 1984 (1981)	Metal Priestess (1981)

Professional ratings
Review scores
Source	Rating
Allmusic	3.5/5 stars

Beyond the Valley of 1984 is the second studio album by the American punk rock and heavy metal band Plasmatics. It was released in May 1981 by Stiff Records and spent nine weeks on the US Billboard 200 chart, peaking at number 142 in the summer of 1981.

After the success of their first studio album and tour, the band began recording their follow-up album in New York City. After the amount of time and money that was put into the band's debut studio album, New Hope for the Wretched, Bruce Kirkland at Stiff Records agreed to put up the funds as long as Rod Swenson produced, and Beyond the Valley of 1984 was done in less than three weeks at a quarter of the cost of New Hope for the Wretched.

Swenson proposed the name Beyond the Valley of 1984 for the album, and the tour became The 1984 World Tour. In between touring drummers, Alice Cooper's Neal Smith was brought in to do the drumming for Beyond the Valley of 1984, and the album, with its Orwellian and apocalyptic theme and songs such as "Masterplan", "Pig Is a Pig" and "Sex Junkie", were released a few months later.

Beyond the Valley of 1984 was recorded at New York's The Ranch, a studio owned by John Andrew "Andy" Parks, a singer-songwriter from Texas. A promotional tape exists with Perks doing the voice-over in an over-the-top Texan accent. The Ranch was equipped with a modified MCI JH-416 console, a 3M M-79 24-track and an Ampex ATR-102 1/4-inch two-track. Engineer Eddie Ciletti was brought in during the second phase to overdub guitars, vocals, electric chain saw and mix. Mixing was "unconventional" for a punk record due to rather "strict" parameters established by Swenson. Beyond the Valley of 1984 would not have any wide stereo panning, and it had to be mixed at a level low enough so that he could conduct business over the phone. The mix was done almost entirely on Auratone monitors.

During recording for the album, the band were booked on the Tom Snyder late-night television show, where Snyder introduced them as "possibly the greatest punk rock band in the entire world".

Beyond the Valley of 1984 was re-released in 2000 by Plasmatics Media, Inc.

== Track listing ==
All tracks are written by Richie Stotts and Rod Swenson, except for where noted.

No.	Title	Writer(s)	Length
1.	"Incantation"	Rod Swenson; Wes Beech	2:13
2.	"Masterplan"		3:10
3.	"Headbanger"		3:25
4.	"Summer Nite"		4:46
5.	"Nothing"	Swenson; Beech	3:42
6.	"Fast Food Service"		1:22
7.	"Hit Man" (Live Milan)	Swenson; Beech	3:46
8.	"Living Dead"		3:46
9.	"Sex Junkie"	Swenson; Beech; Richie Stotts	3:08
10.	"Plasma Jam" (Live Milan)	Beech; Stotts	8:08
11.	"Pig Is a Pig"	Jean Beauvoir; Stotts	4:55
Total length:			42:09

== Charts ==
Chart (1981)	Peak position
US Billboard 200	142

== Personnel ==
- Wendy O. Williams - vocals, chainsaw
- Wes Beech - rhythm guitars
- Richie Stotts - lead guitars
- Jean Beauvoir - bass, piano, synthesizers
- Neal Smith - drums, percussion

== Production ==
- Produced by The Plasmatics & Rod Swenson
- Mixed by Eddie Ciletti (also recorded overdubs)
