= Kommander of Kaos =

Studio album by Wendy O. Williams
- Released: February 21, 1986
- Recorded: 1984
- Studio: Broccoli Rabe Studios (Fairfield, New Jersey)
- Genre: Heavy metal; punk rock
- Length: 34:14
- Label: Gigasaurus
- Producer: Rod Swenson

Wendy O. Williams chronology
WOW (1984)	Kommander of Kaos (1986)	Maggots: The Record (1987)

Professional ratings
Review scores
Source	Rating
AllMusic	3/5 stars
Kerrang!	1/5 stars

Kommander of Kaos is the second solo studio album released by Wendy O. Williams after her group, the Plasmatics, went on hiatus. The album was recorded in 1984 but not released until 1986. A live version of the Gene Simmons-penned "Ain't None of Your Business" appears on this album (the song previously appeared on her debut album).

The album has been re-released by several independent labels in recent years (such as Plasmatics Media and Powerage).

== Track listing ==
1. "Hoy Hey (Live to Rock)" (Swenson, Ray)
2. "Pedal to the Metal" (Swenson, Ray, Smith)
3. "Goin' Wild" (Swenson, Ray)
4. "Ain't None of Your Business" (live) (Simmons, Vincent, Carr)
5. "Party" (Swenson, Beech)
6. "Jailbait" (Kilmister, Taylor, Clarke)
7. "Bad Girl" (Swenson, Beech)
8. "Fight for the Right" (Swenson, Ray)
9. "(Work That Muscle) F**k That Booty" (Swenson, Ray)

== Personnel ==
- Wendy O. Williams – vocals
- Michael Ray – guitar, background vocals
- Greg Smith – bass guitar, background vocals
- T.C. Tolliver – drums
- Wes Beech – guitar
