= Jean Beauvoir =

American musician

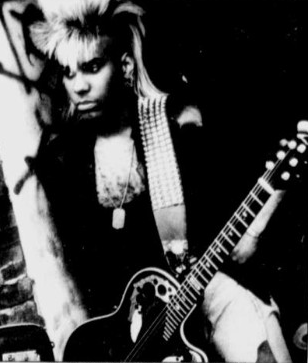

Background information
- Born: Chicago, Illinois, U.S.
- Genres: Rock, hard rock, pop rock, punk rock
- Instruments: Vocals, guitar, bass, keyboards, synthesizer, piano, drums
- Years active: 1978–present
- Labels: Columbia, Interscope, Virgin, Now & Then, Voodoo Island, Frontiers, Avex
- Website: jeanbeauvoir.com

Jean Beauvoir is an American singer, bassist, guitarist, multi-instrumentalist, songwriter, producer and entertainment executive. He came to prominence in the early 1980s with the punk group the Plasmatics and went on to work with Little Steven, Kiss, the Ramones and as a solo artist.

== Biography ==
Beauvoir was born in Chicago to parents of Haitian background. He played drums as a child and switched to bass as a teenager. He was Gary U.S. Bonds' musical director at age 14; following this, he sang in the doo wop group the Flamingos. He gained his first professional experience with these groups touring the US performing at Dick Clark revival concerts. He was kicked out of his home by his father at age 15, due to his desire to pursue music as a profession. He lived with band members, then on his own. He moved to New York City during the punk rock explosion and answered a newspaper ad for a bassist, which led to his joining the Plasmatics for three albums. While with the Plasmatics and subsequently, Beauvoir sported a conspicuous blond mohawk.

He left the group after their release Beyond the Valley of 1984 to join Steve Van Zandt's Little Steven & the Disciples of Soul for two albums.

In 1985, Beauvoir co-wrote and recorded several songs with Paul Stanley of the band Kiss for their thirteenth studio album, Asylum. Beauvoir even played bass and provided backing vocals in Gene Simmons' absence on the songs "Who Wants to Be Lonely" and "Uh! All Night." Following this, he launched a solo career with the album Drums Along the Mohawk, released in the U.K. on Virgin Records in 1986. That same year, the track "Feel the Heat" was chosen by Sylvester Stallone for his film, Cobra. The song was a hit, charting Top 10 across Europe and Australia and reaching No. 73 on the Billboard Hot 100. On the strength of the single, Drums Along the Mohawk was released in the U.S. and peaked at No. 93 on the Billboard 200.

Beauvoir produced and co-wrote the Ramones song "My Brain Is Hanging Upside Down," originally titled "Bonzo Goes To Bitburg." In addition to his film music work with Sylvester Stallone, his credit list includes the title tracks or theme songs for the movies Pet Sematary, where he produced and arranged the Ramones' biggest radio hit, which reached No. 4 on Billboards Modern Rock Chart, Shocker, Flawless, School of Rock, Christmas with the Kranks, where he produced and arranged the song Merry Christmas (I Don't Want To Fight Tonight), and performed, produced and wrote the end title song Merry Christmas To All of the World, The Guilty, Rock 'n' Roll High School Forever, Berlin Nights, RV, Unthinkable, and Why Him?

Beauvoir founded and is CEO/President of Voodoo Island Entertainment Group whose divisions included Voodoo Island Records and Voodoo Island Productions. Beauvoir is also the founder and CEO/President of Hot Boy Music and Tigre Noire Music.

For 6 1/2 years, c. 2004–2010, Beauvoir took a break from performing and is CEO/managing director of Steven Van Zandt's media and entertainment company, Renegade Nation.

Beauvoir continues to produce, write and lead his group Crown of Thorns. Crown of Thorns re-released their 2008 CD "Faith" on June 9, 2009, in the US through Lost Cathedral Sony Red. He also writes and produces for other artists.

In 2014, Beauvoir was one of the executive producers of the "Hit" television show for SBS Discovery Television featuring the comedian "Kristian Valen", he also released an album "American Trash" worldwide through the label Frontiers Records with Micki Free under the project name Beauvoir/Free in June 2015.

May 2015, Beauvoir was recruited as U.S. CEO of the Norwegian children's animated property, City of Friends. Beauvoir has since resigned from this position.

Beauvoir appeared at the three-day Rockingham 2016 festival on Saturday October 22, second to the headliner Steelheart. Beauvoir also appeared at Bang Your Head Festival, Germany 2016, Graspop Festival, Belgium 2016, Azkena Rock Festival, Spain 2016 and performed at Ramblin Man Fair, UK 2016.

== Personal life ==
Beauvoir lives in Bonita Springs, Florida.

== Discography ==
=== The Plasmatics ===
- New Hope for the Wretched (Stiff Records, 1980)
- Metal Priestess (Stiff Records, 1981)
- Beyond the Valley of 1984 (Stiff Records, 1981)

=== Solo ===
- Drums Along the Mohawk (Virgin Records, Columbia Records, 1986)
- "Feel the Heat" (Virgin Records, Columbia Records, Scotti Bros single 1986 lead track for Sylvester Stallone's Cobra film) Billboard Hot 100 #73
- "Missing the Young Days" (Virgin Records, Columbia Records 1986)
- Jacknifed (Columbia Records, 1988)
- "Gamblin' Man" (Virgin Records, single, 1988)
- Rockin' in the Street (Virgin Records, 1996)
- Bare to the Bones (Frontiers, Point Records, 2001)
- "Here She Comes" (Frontiers, Point Records Title track for film "The Guilty" starring Bill Pullman)
- "Monday" (Frontiers, Point Records (single)
- Chameleon (Edel Records, 2003)
- "Merry Christmas To All of the World" (Wicked Cool Records End title track for the film Christmas With the Kranks, 2004)
- "Jean Beauvoir AKA Voodoo Man" "The Rhythm" (Kontor/Armada
- Rock Masterpieces Vol 1 (Voodoo Island, 2017)
- Rock Masterpieces Vol 2 (Voodoo Island, 2017)

=== Crown of Thorns ===
- Crown of Thorns (1993)
- Raw Thorns (demos from 1991 to 1994) (1994) (re-released in 2002 with bonus DVD)
- 21 Thorns (re-release of first album and bonus disc of live tracks) (1995)
- Breakthrough (1996)
- Lost Cathedral (1998)
- Destiny Unknown (2000)
- Karma (2002)
- Crown Jewels (greatest hits) (2004)
- Faith (2008)
- "Are You Ready" (single)

=== Voodoo X ===
- Vol. 1 The Awakening (1989)

=== Beauvoir-Free ===
- American Trash (2015)

=== Production, songwriting and performance (other artists) ===
- Little Steven and the Disciples of Soul – bass and vocals on Men Without Women – 1982
- Little Steven and the Disciples of Soul – bass and vocals on Voice of America – 1983
- Little Steven and the Disciples of Soul – bass and vocals on Greatest Hits – 1999
- Little Steven – backing vocals on Born Again Savage – 1999
- Little Steven – Christmas A Go Go – 2008
- Kiss – "Thrills in the Night" (songwriter and bass on Animalize – 1984)
- Kiss – Asylum – (songwriter, bass and backing vocals 1985)
- Kiss – The Box Set (songwriter, bass, vocals – 2001)
- Kiss – Exposed (songwriter, bass and vocals – 1987)
- Kiss – Thrills in the Night (songwriter, bass and vocals – 1985) (single)
- Kiss – Uh All Night (songwriter, bass and vocals) 1987 (single)
- Kiss – Who Wants To be Lonely (songwriter, bass and vocals) (single) 1987
- Ramones – Animal Boy (producer, mixing for the album, songwriter and instrumentation on the singles "Something to Believe In", "My Brain Is Hanging Upside Down (Bonzo Goes to Bitburg)" and "She Belongs to Me" – 1986)
- Ramones – Brain Drain (producer and songwriter – 1989)
- Ramones – Pet Sematary (producer and songwriter – 1989) (single)
- Ramones – The Chrysalis Years (producer – 2002)
- Ramones – Loud, Fast Ramones: Their Toughest Hits (producer and songwriter – 2002)
- Ramones – Masters of Rock (producer and songwriter – 2002)
- Ramones – The Best of the Ramones (producer and songwriter- 2004)
- Ramones – Weird Tales of the Ramones (producer and songwriter – 2005)
- Ramones – Greatest Hits (producer and songwriter – 2006)
- Ramones – We're Outta Here (producer and songwriter)
- Ramones – My Brain Is Hanging Upside Down (Bonzo Goes To Bitburg) (producer and songwriter) (single)
- Ramones – We're Outta Here (producer and songwriter)
- Ramones – Merry Christmas I Don't Want to Fight Tonight (producer) (single)
- Ramones- Mania (producer and songwriter)
- Ramones – We're Outta Here (producer and songwriter)
- Ramones – Blitzkrieg in Athens (producer and songwriter)
- Ramones – All the Best (producer and songwriter)
- Ramones – All the Stuff (producer and songwriter)
- Ramones – Something to Believe In (producer and songwriter)
- Ramones – Mania 2 (producer and songwriter)
- Ramones – Loco Live |producer and songwriter)
- Ramones – Anthology (producer and songwriter)
- Ramones – The Best of the Chrysalis Years (producer and songwriter)
- We're a Happy Family: A Tribute to Ramones (songwriter on "Something to Believe In" performed by the Pretenders – 2003)
- John Waite – "Dark Side of the Sun" (songwriter on No Brakes – 1984)
- Nona Hendryx – "I Need Love" (songwriter on The Heat – 1985) (single)
- Cameo – guitar on Machismo – 1988
- Carole Davis – "Love to Make Love to You" (songwriter) on I'm No Angel – 1993)
- Glenn Hughes – "The Liar" (songwriter on From Now On... – 1994)
- NSync – "Forever Young" (songwriter on *NSYNC – 1997)
- Bruce Springsteen and the E Street Band – (duet on "Hungry Heart" with Bercy Nights 1999)
- Doro – "Salvaje", "Sister Darkness" (songwriter, guitar on Fight – 2002)
- School of Rock (soundtrack) – Ramones: "My Brain Is Hanging Upside Down" (producer and songwriter – 2003)
- Christmas with the Kranks (soundtrack) – Ramones: "Merry Christmas to All of the World" (producer – 2004)
- Joey Ramone – Ya Know? (producer – 2012)
- Joey Ramone – "There's Got to Be More to Life", "Spanish Eyes" (producer – 2012)
- Debbie Harry – "Do It Yourself" (songwriter – 2012)
- Lionel Richie/Beauvoir – Chameleon Album "I Wanna Know" (producer, songwriter and all instruments – 2012)
- Vivi Jiang – "Fashion Show" (songwriter – 2013)
- Shinee – Mini Album "Everybody" (songwriter – 2013)
- Nona Hendryx "Mutatis Mundtatis" (producer/songwriter and all instruments)
- Jonghyun – EP "Base" (songwriter/producer -2015)
- Voices of Rock – (featured lead vocalist – 2015) (album)
- Nona Hendryx – "In Praise of Older Men" (producer, songwriter and all instruments)
- Radioactive – Legends of Rock – "You'll Find the Fire (lead vocalist and songwriter 2015)
- Lordi – Killection – "Scream Demon" and "Like a Bee to the Honey" (co-songwriter – 2020)
- Lordi – Humanimals – "Like a Bee to the Honey" and "Humanimal" (co-songwriter – 2021)

=== Film, television and video ===
- Cobra (Sylvester Stallone) "Feel the Heat" (music producer, songwriter, performer and all instruments for lead song in film and trailer) 1986
- Christmas with the Kranks (Tim Allen, Jamie Lee Curtis, Dan Aykroyd) (performer, producer, songwriter and Instrumentation) end credit song, "Merry Christmas to All of the World"
- Pet Sematary (Stephen King) (producer of title track "Pet Sematary")
- The Guilty (Bill Pullman) "Here She Comes" (music producer, songwriter, performer and all instruments for end credit song)
- Flawless (Robert De Niro) (music producer, songwriter and Instrumentation for soundtrack "La Chica Marita" by Marcus Schenkenberg
- Lifestyles of the Ramones (Featured Interview)
- Shocker (Wes Craven) songwriter of the title track "Shocker") film and soundtrack, 1989
- Shocker (Wes Craven) "The Awakening" (music performer, producer and songwriter and Instrumentation) for film and soundtrack, 1989
- Unthinkable of (Samuel L. Jackson) Promotional Video (music producer and songwriter)
- School of Rock (Jack Black) (music producer, songwriter) for "My Brain Is Hanging Upside Down" by the Ramones
- Rock 'n Roll High School Forever (music producer, songwriter and all instruments) for the song "Cut Me To Pieces" performed by Dee Dee Ramone
- Berlin Nights (Gabriela Tscherniak) performer and actor
- Sex, Violence & Values – Television Movie (music producer and songwriter "UH! All Night", by the music group Kiss)
- The Ramones "My Brain Is Hanging Upside Down" RV (Robin Williams) Commercial (music producer and songwriter) 1986
- Doro "Burn It Up" Doro: 25 Years In Rock (featured performance)
- Too Tough To Die – A Tribute To Johnny Ramone Documentary "Ramones" – (music producer and songwriter) 2006
- So We May Grow – TV Short Story (music Score Composer) 2014
- Kanal Valen – (SBS Discovery) Television Series (Executive producer and featured guest/performer) 2015
- School OZ – (World's First Hologram Musical) (music songwriter for the Kpop Group Shinee)
- Why Him? (music producer) Ramones – End title song, "Merry Christmas, I Don't Want to Fight Tonight" 2017
- The Killers Requiem (actor and producer, music supervisor)
