= Maggots: The Record =

Studio album by Wendy O. Williams and Plasmatics
- Released: February 18, 1987
- Recorded: 1987
- Studios: Broccoli Rabe Studios, Fairfield, New Jersey
- Genres: Hard rock; thrash metal
- Length: 32:05
- Labels: WOW/Profile; GWR
- Producer: Rod Swenson

Wendy O. Williams chronology
Kommander of Kaos (1986)	Maggots: The Record (1987)	Deffest! and Baddest! (1988)

Plasmatics chronology
Coup d'Etat (1982)	Maggots: The Record (1987)

Maggots: The Record is the fourth studio album by American rock singer Wendy O. Williams and her band Plasmatics. It was released on February 18, 1987, by Profile Records. Labeled as a special "9th Anniversary Album", it was the last album released by the band. Despite being labeled a "Plasmatics" album, it is often regarded as another Wendy O. Williams solo album, largely in part because her name is over that of the band, the merchandise for the tour has the WOW logo from her solo career, Michael Ray plays lead guitar here, and the only original member is Wes Beech on rhythm guitar. All music on the record was written and arranged by Michael Ray, except for "Propagators". Maggots: The Record was recorded in 1987 and is a concept album set 25 years in the future, where environmental abuse and the burning of fossil fuels have created a greenhouse effect, leading to an end of the world scenario. The album features various scenes of the White Family over the course of three days. The family is devoured while watching a TV game show. Valerie, the girlfriend of television reporter Bruce is devoured by three massive maggots while lying in her boyfriend's bed. The final scene of the record shows the entire human population is headed for imminent annihilation. The album was released through Profile Records under the WOW label in the United States and overseas by GWR Records, which had been started by Motörhead's longtime manager Doug Smith.

== Composition ==
Maggots: The Record is often credited as being the first "Thrash Metal Opera." This comes largely because of the album follows the rock opera formula done in a form of thrash metal. Every other track on the album is spoken-word and is used to describe various scenes between songs.

The central theme of the album is that a group of scientists trying to eliminate trash in the rivers and oceans develop a breed of maggot designed to eat the garbage and then, when the trash is gone, the maggot dies. Melting glaciers bring floods that carry the maggots into contact with land creatures. The genetically engineered maggots continue to eat and breed, growing larger with every cycle. Scientists and politicians are overheard discussing exactly what can be done, trying to calm the doomed populace. By the album's end, human beings are extinct and the maggots have taken over.

== Critical reception ==
Professional ratings
Review scores
Source	Rating
AllMusic	3/5 stars
Kerrang!	5/5 stars

Upon its release, Maggots: The Record received generally positive review from music critics. A review in Kerrang! gave the album 5 out of 5 Ks, "Quite simply a masterpiece... a work of genius." Wendy's vocals "reduces Celtic Frost's Tom G. Warrior's 'death grunts' to mere whimpers" it went on coupled with "a mixture of hedonistic operatic melodies…gut forged to some of the heaviest armadillo beats you're ever like to hear committed to vinyl."

== Track listing ==
No.	Title	Writer(s)	Length
1.	"Overture / Introduction (Narrator)"	Rod Swenson; Wes Beech; Michael Ray	0:59
2.	"You're a Zombie"	Swenson; Ray	2:45
3.	"The White's Apartment / Full Meal Diner"		2:46
4.	"The Day of the Humans Is Gone"	Swenson; Ray	3:31
5.	"The Central Research Laboratory / Valerie and Bruce on the Phone"		3:06
6.	"Destroyers"	Swenson; Ray	3:07
7.	"The White's Apartment / Bruce's Bedroom"		1:40
8.	"Brain Dead"	Swenson; Ray	2:33
9.	"The White's Apartment / Bruce's Bedroom"		2:30
10.	"Propagators"	Swenson; Beech	3:00
11.	"The White's Apartment / Fire Escape"		2:02
12.	"Finale"	Swenson; Beech; Ray	4:06
Total length:			32:05

== Personnel ==
Credits adapted from the album's liner notes.

Plasmatics

- Wendy O. Williams – vocals
- Wes Beech – rhythm guitar, lead guitar (track 10), backing vocals
- Michael Ray – rhythm and lead guitar, backing vocals
- Chris Romanelli – bass guitar, backing vocals
- Ray Callahan – drums, backing vocals

Voice actors

- James Gerth – the narrator
- Jeanine P. Morick – Paula White, Dr. Wanda Carnot
- Jeff Griglak – Josh White
- Scott Harlan – Joe White, Dr. Richard Boltzmann, Lance
- Tony Marzocco – Bruce Maltin
- Suzanne Bedford – Valerie, Cindy White
- Andy Bleiberg – anonymous TV anchor #1, TV game show host
- Rod Swenson (credited as Stellar Axeman) – anonymous TV anchor #2

Production

- Rod Swenson – producer
- Wes Beech – associate producer
- Jon Smith – engineer
- Al Theurer – engineer
- Larry Peet – assistant engineer

Packaging

- Rod Swenson (credited as Butch Star) – cover design
- Eric Karalis – cover painting
- John Michaels – photography
- Jack Rudy – Wendy O. Williams' tattoo
