= Chosei Funahara =

Musician and film director

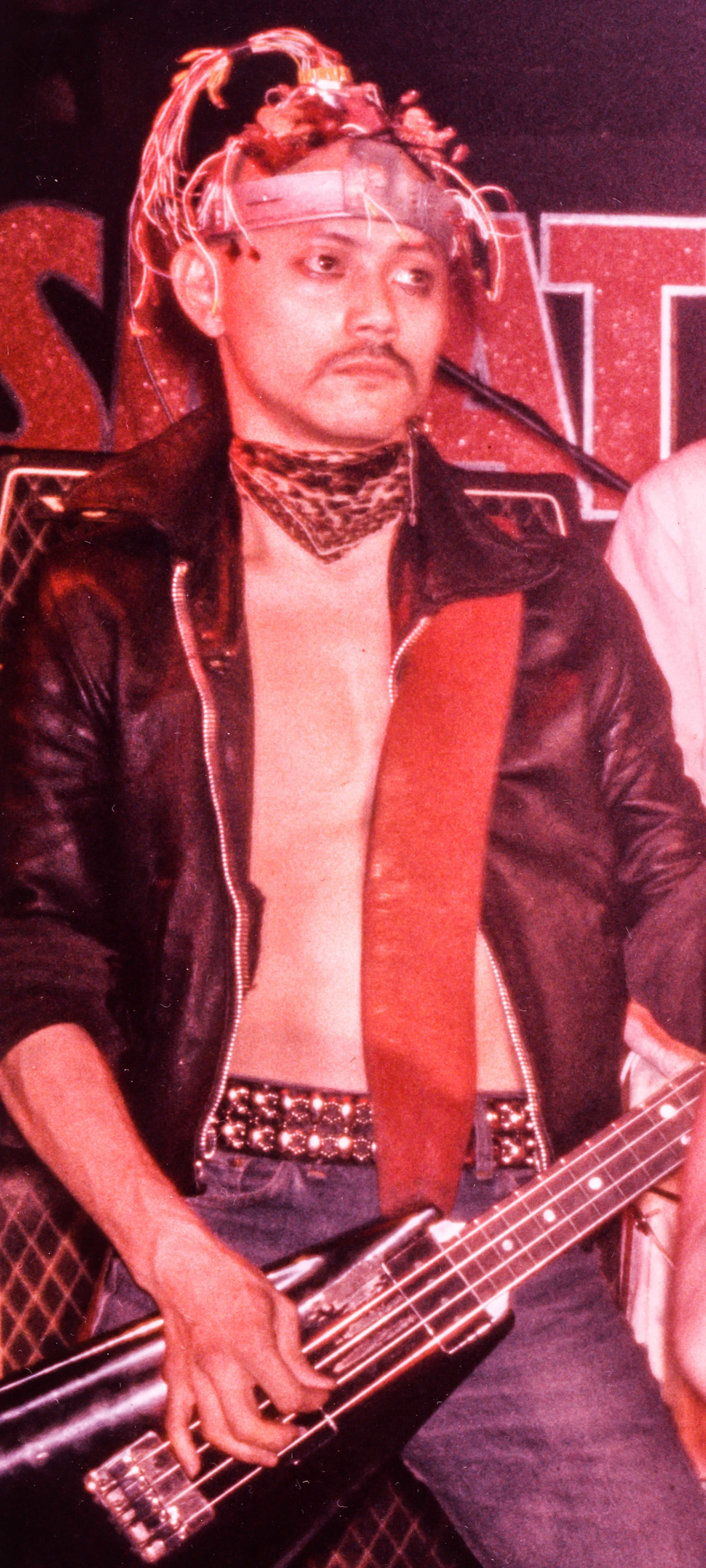
- Funahara in 1979

Background information
- Born: December 10, 1953 (age 72); Hyogo, Japan
- Occupations: Musician, filmmaker
- Instrument: Bass guitar

Osao Chosei Funahara (born December 10, 1953) is a musician and film director and producer. Born in Hyōgo Prefecture of Japan, Chosei Funahara was educated in both the United States and Japan. He received his Bachelor of Fine Arts at the Nihon University College of Art's Cinema department in Tokyo. While pursuing New York University's NYU Graduate School of Arts and Science (Cinema Studies), he performed as bassist and founding member of the cult punk rock group the Plasmatics.

== Filmography ==
=== Producer ===
- Cagney Lies (2008)
- Still Normal (2007)
- Masabumi Kikuchi (post-production)
- Dark Voices (2001) (co-producer)
- Tokyo Decadence (1992) (producer) ... a.k.a. Sex Dreams of Topaz (Hong Kong) ... a.k.a. Topâzu ( Japanese )
- In the Soup (1992) (co-executive producer)
- Fatal Mission (1990) (producer) ... a.k.a. DeadLock (Japanese) ... a.k.a. Enemy (Germany)
- Raffles Hotel (1989) (associate producer)
- Sons (1989) (executive producer)

=== Other film credits ===
- Dark Voices (2001) (Director)
- Kyoko (2000) (production consultant)
- Amerikanskaya doch (1995) (production consultant) ... a.k.a. Американская дочь (Russia) ... a.k.a. American Daughter
- Somebody to Love (1994) (special thanks)
- Hsi yen (1993) (soundtrack supervisor) ... a.k.a. The Wedding Banquet (USA)

In addition to these feature film credits, Chosei Funahara has produced or directed more than sixty short films, documentaries and numerous TV commercials in Japan, the United States and Europe.

=== Selected short films ===
- War (1999)
- Widget (1999), directed by Funahara and produced by Hal Hartley
- Trouble (1994), directed by Richard Edson
- DEADEND (1994), directed by Miron Zownir
- Cacophony, Lonesome Hitmen from Montana, for German TV ZDF (1988)
- Cockroach Alarm in Spanish Harlem (1987)
- New York City Marathon (1986), written by Ryu Murakami
- The Houseguest (1986), featuring John Cale and Zoë Lund

=== Music video ===
- I am Siam (1984) directed by Funahara, winner of the American Video Award.

== Discography ==
=== Extended play (EPs) ===
Title	Format	Year
Meet the Plasmatics	12" EP	1979

=== Singles ===
Title	Format	Year	UK Singles Chart
"Butcher Baby" b/w "Fast Food Service" & "Concrete Shoes"	7"	1978	
"Dream Lover" b/w "Corruption" & "Want You Baby"	7"	1979	
"Butcher Baby" b/w "Tight Black Pants" (live)	7"	1980	55
