= Wendy O. Williams =

American singer (1949–1998)

- Williams with the Plasmatics in 1979

Background information
- Born: Wendy Orlean Williams; May 28, 1949; Webster, New York, U.S.
- Died: April 6, 1998 (aged 48) Storrs, Connecticut, U.S.
- Genres: Punk rock; shock rock; heavy metal
- Occupations: Singer; songwriter; actress
- Years active: 1976–1990
- Formerly of: Plasmatics
- Website: wendyowilliams.com

Wendy Orlean Williams (May 28, 1949 – April 6, 1998) was an American singer, best known as the lead singer of the punk rock band Plasmatics. She was noted for her onstage theatrics, which included partial nudity, exploding equipment, firing a shotgun, and chainsawing guitars. Performing her own stunts in videos, she often sported a mohawk hairstyle. In 1985, during the height of her popularity as a solo artist, she was nominated for a Grammy Award for Best Female Rock Vocal Performance.

Williams left home at 16 and hitchhiked to Colorado, earning money by crocheting string bikinis. She traveled to Florida and Europe landing various jobs such as lifeguard, stripper, macrobiotic cook, and server at Dunkin' Donuts. After arriving in New York City in 1976, she began performing in live sex shows and in 1979 appeared in the pornographic film called Candy Goes to Hollywood. That same year, manager Rod Swenson recruited her to be a member of the Plasmatics. The two became romantically involved. The band quickly became known on the local underground scene, performing at music venues such as CBGBs.

After three albums with the Plasmatics, Williams embarked on a solo career and released her debut album, WOW, in 1984. Albums Kommander of Kaos (1986) and Deffest! and Baddest! (1988) followed, before her retirement from the music industry. Williams made her non-adult film screen debut in Tom DeSimone's film Reform School Girls (1986), for which she recorded the title song. She also appeared in the 1989 comedy Pucker Up and Bark Like a Dog and the television series The New Adventures of Beans Baxter and MacGyver.

On April 6, 1998, Williams fatally shot herself near her home in Storrs, Connecticut. She had attempted suicide twice in the years leading up to her death. Allegedly, she had also been struggling with deep depression.

== Life and career ==
=== 1949–1976: Early life ===
Williams was born to Robert F. Williams, a chemist at Eastman Kodak, and Audrey Stauber Williams (1921–2008) on May 28, 1949, in Webster, New York. She studied clarinet at the Community Music School program of the University of Rochester's Eastman School of Music, and later was a clarinetist in her high school's concert band. At the age of six, she appeared tap-dancing on the Howdy Doody show as a member of the "Peanut Gallery".

She had her first run-in with the law at the age of 15, when she was arrested for sunbathing nude. Williams attended R. L. Thomas High School in Webster at least partway through the 10th grade, but left school before graduating. Her schoolmates and teachers recalled Williams as a "shy and pretty girl, an average student who played in the junior high band, paid attention to her hair and clothes, and who spoke so softly ... you had to lean toward her to hear her."

At the age of 16, Williams left her home and hitchhiked to Colorado where she earned money by selling crocheted string bikinis. Afterward, she headed for Florida, working as a lifeguard, and then to Europe, where she worked as a macrobiotic cook in London and as a dancer with a traveling dance troupe. Around that time, she was arrested on multiple occasions for shoplifting and passing counterfeit money.

In 1976, Williams arrived in New York City, where she saw an ad in the Show Business magazine that lay open on the floor of the Port Authority Bus Terminal station. It was a casting call for radical artist and Yale University graduate Rod Swenson's experimental "Captain Kink's Theatre". She replied to the ad and began performing in live sex shows. She later appeared in Gail Palmer's adult film Candy Goes to Hollywood (1979), credited as Wendy Williams. She was featured as a performer on a parody of The Gong Show shooting ping pong balls across the set from her vagina.

=== 1977–1983: Plasmatics ===
By 1977, Swenson had become Williams's manager and recruited her to join his newly formed punk rock band, Plasmatics. They made their debut in July 1978 at the Manhattan music club CBGB. The Plasmatics toured the world, although a concert in London was cancelled by the promoters due to safety reasons, causing the press to dub the band "anarchists". During the shooting of an appearance on SCTV in 1981, studio heads decided they would not air Williams's performance unless she changed out of a costume that revealed her nipples. Williams refused. The show's make-up artists found a compromise and painted her breasts black.

In January 1981, police in Milwaukee, Wisconsin, arrested Williams for simulating masturbation on stage and charged her with battery to an officer and obscene conduct. She was cleared of all charges. Later that year in Cleveland, Ohio, Williams was acquitted of an obscenity charge for simulating sex on stage wearing only shaving cream; she subsequently covered her nipples with electrical tape to avoid arrest. In November, an Illinois judge sentenced her to one year's supervision and fined her $35 (equivalent to $124 in 2025) for attacking a freelance photographer who tried to take her picture as she jogged along the Chicago lakefront.

=== 1984–1986: Solo career, WOW and Kommander of Kaos ===
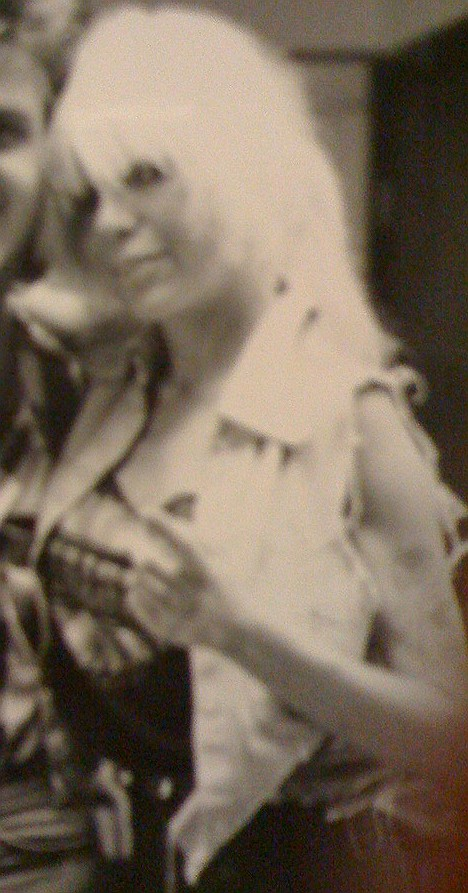
Wendy O. Williams, undated photo

Williams recorded a duet of the country hit "Stand by Your Man" with Lemmy of Motörhead in 1982. In 1984, she released the W.O.W. album, produced by Gene Simmons of Kiss. Kiss members Paul Stanley, Ace Frehley, and Eric Carr, also perform on the album. Gene Simmons brought in Michael Ray to play lead guitar; Ray was previously auditioning on Creatures of the Night studio solos. Simmons himself played bass but is credited as Reginald Van Helsing. In 1985, Williams starred in The Rocky Horror Show at the Westport Playhouse in St. Louis. The show played for over six months, but a nationwide tour fell through.

In 1986, she starred in Tom DeSimone's indie-film Reform School Girls. Neither she nor manager Rod Swenson liked the film when it came out, but at this point the producers had heard Kommander of Kaos (her second solo album) and wanted to include three tracks from the album in the movie score. They approached Swenson about producing the title track for the film and having Williams sing it. The band reluctantly agreed to do it. Uncle Brian from the Broc joined Swenson as co-producer and also played sax. He also appeared in the video that the film company had asked Swenson to produce and direct, playing the sax and wearing a tutu.

=== 1987–1990: Reunion with Plasmatics and Deffest! and Baddest! ===
In 1987, Williams starred as the part-time friend/enemy in the underground spy world to the title character on Fox's The New Adventures of Beans Baxter. The Plasmatics' last tour was in late 1988. Williams appeared in Pucker Up and Bark Like a Dog, directed by Paul S. Parco, in 1990.

In 1988, Williams put out another solo album, this time a "thrash rap" album called Deffest! and Baddest! under the name "Ultrafly and the Hometown Girls."

Williams' last known performance of a Plasmatics song occurred due to the prompting of Joey Ramone. She performed "Masterplan" one final time with Richie Stotts, when Stotts' band opened for the Ramones on New Year's Eve, 1988.

=== 1991–1998: Retirement and final years ===
In 1991, Williams moved to Storrs, Connecticut, where she lived with her long-time companion and former manager, Rod Swenson, and worked as an animal rehabilitator and at a food cooperative in nearby Willimantic. She explained her move by saying that she "was pretty fed up dealing with people."

== Personal life ==
Her teachers and other sources described Wendy Williams as a shy and soft-spoken child who was an average student, and who learned to play the clarinet very well in the junior high band—although she herself at numerous times stated that she felt like an outcast and was misunderstood by her strict parents, whom she referred to as "cocktail zombies". Swenson recalled in an interview how Wendy told him there were attempts to have her institutionalized after she became a rebellious teenager. She was said to have "experimented with drugs and furious sex" in her teenage years (though years later as an adult woman in 1979 into the early 1980s she would go on to become a "teetotaler", in the words of her partner).

While making the transition into early adulthood, after running away from her family at the age of 16 and leaving the U.S. to explore the world for several years, for a time Williams became interested in Far Eastern spirituality, religions, and gurus as well as experimenting with mind-altering substances like LSD and mescaline. She continued to try different jobs and lifestyles in order to discover somewhere where she felt she belonged, until eventually finding the show-business magazine ad for Rod Swenson's Sex Fantasy Theater in 1976—he would go on to form and manage their band, the Plasmatics; the two remained lifelong romantic partners until her suicide in 1998. Williams was strictly against sexism in the rock scene. Throughout her musical career, many of her songs featured anti-consumerist and anti-establishment messages. Swenson claims that Williams and he agreed together that they "didn't want to do things that sold, they wanted to do things that were interesting, new territory".

A vegetarian from 1966 until her death, Williams believed in leading a healthy lifestyle and aiming for self-improvement. She was once featured on the cover of the Vegetarian Times. In her later years, she gave up smoking (which she felt very strongly about and would not allow anyone to smoke in her changing rooms) as well as eventually stopping drinking entirely and never using any other drugs; she also became strongly opposed to the high sugar content in easily available processed foods. Swenson recalls that: "Wendy was a consummate professional, always working on her craft, working on the show. She would work out hours every day, she would run six miles a day. She was a total vegetarian, totally into health food. When we were on the road, she always made sure the band was well fed. No processed meats, no white bread". She was known for refusing to wear makeup products manufactured by companies that used animals for laboratory experimentation and she was completely against needless poaching. After leaving the music scene, Swenson and Williams moved to Storrs, Connecticut, in 1991 to live in the geodesic dome house that they built for each other. Williams worked at a food co-op and became a wildlife rehabilitator to help animals, which she loved since her childhood as she was known for taking in and helping wounded wild animals as a child.

Williams once described herself as a "marginal nymphomaniac and terminal exhibitionist". Several sources state that she was struggling with deep depression for many years before her death, as the two suicide attempts prior to her death also indicate. Although some have retroactively referred to her as straight edge, and her lifestyle supports this as she never used drugs and stopped drinking/smoking at a certain point in her life, there is no known evidence to suggest that Williams identified as such. When Williams was promoting Kommander of Kaos during a televised interview with Joan Rivers, Rivers said Williams' favorite movie is The Texas Chain Saw Massacre – which could either be a true statement or a simple reference to the Plasmatics' onstage stunts at their concerts, that regularly involved acts of destruction and chainsawing through guitars. In several interviews, Williams spoke about her passion for tattoos. On her brief appearance in the adult film Candy Goes to Hollywood, Williams was quoted as saying: "It was just like working in a donut shop, except you didn't wear a paper hat".

== Death ==
Williams first attempted suicide in 1993 by hammering a knife into her chest where it lodged in her sternum. However, she changed her mind and called Rod Swenson to take her to the hospital. She attempted suicide again in 1997 with an overdose of ephedrine.

Williams died of a self-inflicted gunshot wound on April 6, 1998, when she was 48. Swenson, her partner for more than 20 years, returned to their home in the area where they had lived since moving to Connecticut from New York City. He found a package she left for him that contained some noodles he liked, a packet of seeds for growing garden greens, some Oriental massage balm, and sealed letters from her.

The suicide letters, which included a "living will" refusing life support, a love letter to Swenson and various lists of things to do, caused Swenson to begin searching the woods for her. After about an hour, as dusk fell, he found her body in a wooded area with a pistol lying on the ground nearby. She had apparently been feeding wild squirrels moments before her suicide, as well as putting a bag over her head before shooting herself to spare her partner the horrible sight. "Wendy's act was not an irrational in-the-moment act," he said; for four years she had contemplated suicide. Swenson reportedly described her as "despondent" at the time of her death. This is what she reportedly wrote in a suicide note regarding her decision:

I don't believe that people should take their own lives without deep and thoughtful reflection over a considerable period of time. I do believe strongly, however, that the right to do so is one of the most fundamental rights that anyone in a free society should have. For me, much of the world makes no sense, but my feelings about what I am doing ring loud and clear to an inner ear and a place where there is no self, only calm.

Joey Ramone and many others issued statements at the time of her death. On Motörhead's 1999 live album Everything Louder Than Everyone Else, before the song "No Class", Motörhead vocalist Lemmy said that he wanted to dedicate the song to her.

A memorial was held at CBGB on May 18. Several of Williams' former Plasmatics co-members (Chosei Funahara, Richie Stotts, Wes Beech, Stu Deutsch, Jean Beauvoir and TC Tolliver) played a six-song set with four of them handling the vocals.

== Legacy ==
In 1981, People magazine put Williams on their best dressed style list.

Wendy O. Williams was promoted in the number 72 July issue of Kerrang! magazine in 1984 while also being the first woman to be featured on its front cover. She also was featured on the cover of Vegetarian Times issue 83, in July 1984.

Williams was featured in a Playboy pictorial in 1986, skydiving naked, where she was described as the "leather-clad queen of heavy metal".

Various sources have referred to Wendy O. Williams as the "Queen of Shock Rock", "High Priestess of Metal", "Queen of Heavy Metal", "Evel Knievelette", "Dominatrix of the Decibels", etc.

In the game Cyberpunk 2077, the character Johnny Silverhand expresses admiration for Williams and her legendary parties. He mourns her death which had a tremendous impact on him. The title of the in-game quest “The Damned” also shares its name with the song by the Plasmatics.

== Discography ==
- WOW (1984)
- Fuck 'N Roll [live EP] (1985)
- Kommander of Kaos (1986)
- Maggots: The Record (1987)
- Deffest! and Baddest! (1988)

With the Plasmatics

- New Hope for the Wretched (1980)
- Beyond the Valley of 1984 (1981)
- Metal Priestess (1981)
- Coup d'etat (1982)
- Maggots: The Record (1987)
- Coup de Grace (2002)

== Filmography ==
- Candy Goes to Hollywood (1979)
- SCTV – Fishin' Musician Sketch (John Candy) (1981)
- Hell Camp of the Gland Robbers (1985)
- Reform School Girls (1986)
- The New Adventures of Beans Baxter (1987)
- Pucker Up and Bark Like a Dog (1990)
- MacGyver (1990)
- Wendy O. Williams and the Plasmatics: 10 Years of Revolutionary Rock and Roll (DVD). MVD Visual. 2006.
