= Chris Romanelli =

Musician

Chris Romanelli was the bassist of the punk rock band Plasmatics from 1981 until 1983 and again in 1986 to 1987, during a time, in 1983, he was the keyboardist. He played on the Metal Priestess, Coup d'Etat and Maggots: The Record albums. After that, he had some brief stints with several other bands but largely faded from the music industry in the mid-1990s. He is currently a practicing attorney in New York.

Chris wrote the music to "The Damned", the only Plasmatics song to be featured in heavy rotation on MTV. "The Damned" still occasionally appears on MTV, on Beavis and Butt-head and other shows.
