= WOW (Wendy O. Williams album) =

Studio album by Wendy O. Williams
- Released: 1984
- Recorded: 1983
- Studio: Right Track Studios, New York City
- Genre: Heavy metal; hard rock
- Length: 36:45
- Label: Passport (US); Music for Nations (Europe)
- Producer: Gene Simmons

Wendy O. Williams chronology
WOW (1984)	Kommander of Kaos (1986)

Singles from WOW
- 1. "It's My Life" Released: 1984

WOW is the debut solo studio album by American singer Wendy O. Williams, released in 1984 by Passport Records. It is her first album appearance after the success with The Plasmatics, which had gone on a hiatus during that time. Williams was nominated for Grammy Award for Best Female Rock Vocal Performance for this album in 1985.

== Background ==
After the release of the album Coup d'État in 1982, The Plasmatics opened for Kiss on their Creatures of the Night tour. By the end of the tour, The Plasmatics' recording contract with Capitol Records wasn't renewed and Kiss bassist Gene Simmons approached Williams and manager Rod Swenson about producing an album. As to avoid legal issues with Capitol, they decided not to use The Plasmatics' name on the record in any way.

WOW is a hard rock album influenced by heavy metal, which marked a musical departure from Williams' previous material with The Plasmatics.

== Recording ==
Simmons recorded the performance of band members from The Plasmatics on the album, namely Wes Beech and T.C. Tolliver on rhythm and lead guitar, and drums, respectively. Bassist Chris Romanelli left 2 weeks before start of the recording due to a disagreement with manager Rod Swenson, and guitarist Richie Stotts left during the recording, according to Beech because Simmons insisted that Stotts's performance was not up to expectations.

Simmons used many additional musicians, in order to not be constrained by a fixed sound or performer. Simmons himself played bass under the pseudonym of Reginald Van Helsing. It was falsely rumored that the pseudonym was for Edward Van Halen, who did not perform on the album in any capacity. Michael Ray was hired as lead guitarist for the album.

Simmons also pulled in the guest-appearance talents of Kiss members Ace Frehley to play on "Bump and Grind", Vinnie Vincent and Eric Carr to co-write "Ain't None of Your Business", Paul Stanley to play on "Ready to Rock" (Beech insists that Stanley's contribution was limited to the motorcycle sounding feedback sound in the beginning), and Eric Carr to play on "Legends Never Die", a 1982 Kiss outtake recorded for Creatures of the Night with Williams's vocals replacing Simmons's.

"It's My Life", a Simmons/Stanley co-write first demoed by Kiss in 1981, was released as the lead single from the album. It later appeared on the soundtrack to the film Reform School Girls (1986), in which Williams starred. Kiss later re-recorded and released their version of the song, as well as the Simmons/Mitch Weissman co-write "Thief in the Night" which ended up on the 1987 album Crazy Nights.

== Reception ==
Professional ratings
Review scores
Source	Rating
AllMusic	3/5 stars
Collector's Guide to Heavy Metal	4/10

WOW received mixed reviews. Ralph Heibutzki or AllMusic wrote, "In some ways, Williams' first solo venture amounts to a watered-down echo of the Plasmatics' own bid for mainstream success, Coup d'Etat (1982), minus the latter record's radical political bent. That's not surprising, with the ever-career-conscious Simmons manning the producer's chair. Despite his best efforts, however, Williams would stay a quintessential cult artist. While not a remarkable record, WOW offers a convincing enough glimpse of the stardom that should have been hers all along."

== Track listing ==
All credits adapted from the original release.

Side one
No.	Title	Writer(s)	Length
1.	"I Love Sex (And Rock and Roll)"	Gene Simmons; Wes Beech; Rod Swenson; T.C. Tolliver; Richie Stotts	3:47
2.	"It's My Life"	Simmons; Paul Stanley	3:58
3.	"Priestess"	Beech; Swenson; Chris Romanelli; Stotts	3:23
4.	"Thief in the Night"	Simmons; Mitch Weissman	3:47
5.	"Opus in Cm7"	Swenson; Romanelli	4:20

Side two
No.	Title	Writer(s)	Length
6.	"Ready to Rock"	Swenson; Romanelli; Stotts	5:11
7.	"Bump and Grind"	Beech; Swenson; Romanelli; Tolliver; Stotts	4:27
8.	"Legends Never Die"	Simmons; Adam Mitchell; Micki Free	4:25
9.	"Ain't None of Your Business"	Simmons; Eric Carr • Vinnie Vincent	3:27

== Personnel ==
Band members

- Wendy O. Williams – vocals
- Wes Beech – rhythm guitar, lead guitar on "It's My Life"
- Michael Ray – lead guitar
- 'Reginald Van Helsing' (Gene Simmons) – bass
- T.C. Tolliver – drums
- The Boys – backing vocals

Additional musicians

- Ace Frehley – lead guitar on "Bump and Grind"
- Paul Stanley – guitar on "Ready to Rock"
- Eric Carr – drums on "Legends Never Die"
- Mitch Weissman – piano on "Opus in Cm7"
- Micki Free – acoustic guitar on "Legends Never Die"

Production

- Frank Filipetti, Tom Roberts – engineers
- Billy Miranda, Tom Brick, Moira Marquis – assistant engineers
- George Marino – mastering
- Gene Simmons – producer
