= Reform School Girls =

- Theatrical release poster
- Directed by: Tom DeSimone
- Written by: Tom DeSimone; Jack Cummins; Daniel Arthur Wray
- Produced by: Jack Cummins; Leo Angelos
- Starring: Linda Carol; Wendy O. Williams; Pat Ast; Sybil Danning; Sherri Stoner
- Cinematography: Howard Wexler
- Edited by: Michael Spence
- Music by: Dan Siegel
- Production companies: Balcor Film Investors; International Cinevision Productions
- Distributed by: New World Pictures
- Release date: August 22, 1986 (United States)
- Running time: 94 minutes
- Country: United States
- Language: English
- Box office: $2,510,433

Reform School Girls is a 1986 American prison black comedy film, written and directed by Tom DeSimone. It stars Linda Carol, Wendy O. Williams, Pat Ast, Sybil Danning and Sherri Stoner, and depicts the story of a young girl (played by Carol) who is sent to a reform school for girls that is operated by a sadistic and evil warden. She also has to deal with the local bully (Williams).

After directing two other women in prison films, Prison Girls (1972) and The Concrete Jungle (1982), DeSimone decided to make a film that would be a spoof of the genre. The role of Warden Sutter in the original script was a man. Producers wanted Danning to play the character of Edna, but DeSimone thought she wasn't good for that part so he changed the role of Warden Sutter to a woman and had Ast play that role instead.

The film received mostly negative reviews from critics.

== Plot ==
The film is a satire of the women in prison film genre and deliberately implements many of the tropes commonly found in such films. Such scenes include nude shower scenes, fight scenes, and a suggested romantic relationship between one of the inmates and an administrator. The overall plot involves a new influx of girls coming to the school. They are immediately confronted with Charlie Chambliss, who is the de facto leader of the school and has an exceedingly close relationship with the head of the ward, Edna. Charlie runs a secret society of girls who are loyal to her and to whom she offers protection. The two main new girls break several of Edna's rules and are punished decisively for their infractions.

Jenny comes to the school after becoming mixed up in a shoot out. When she and another group of girls arrive, they are forced to strip in front of the prison nurse and then take a shower, while being informed that they will be "inspected inside and out". Afterwards, they are forced to stand naked along a wall while the nurse sprays them with delousing fluid.

Jenny later tries to break out after befriending a male driver with whom she has a romantic encounter in the back of his truck. She makes arrangements that he will drive her off the premises but is discovered by a guard and after a scuffle she is apprehended and immediately cast into isolation, where Edna forces her to strip naked before using a firehose to spray her with cold water. Lisa is a runaway who is captured and placed in the reform school, here Jenny is confronted by Charlie and inevitably results in a fight, Jenny is swiftly overwhelmed and left lightly hurt in-front of the other girls, She suffers several losses while at the school including having the cat she adopted stomped to death by Edna. Lisa is punished with isolation. After the death of her cat, Lisa attempts to climb to the top of the tower, followed closely by Edna. When she reaches the top she stumbles backward as Edna confronts her, breaks through the barriers and falls to her death. This causes Jenny to smash through a window, which starts a riot which is only quelled when Warden Sutter shoots a shotgun into the ceiling.

The film culminates in a protest scene after Dr. Norton, a psychiatrist, forces a meeting of administrators over the conditions and treatment of inmates at the school. She intended to have Jenny testify but a doctor determines, despite all evidence to the contrary, that she is ill and will not be able to attend. Therefore, four other inmates are chosen and none of them has any complaints. During the meeting Jenny knocks out a guard and steals her keys, which allows all the girls to march out into the main open area and voice their grudges. Edna, however, gets a hold of a gun and opens fire on them. Edna shoots Charlie and climbs up the tower from which Sutter has broadcast religious-oriented messages as the girls are going to sleep. Charlie climbs a fence and commandeers a school bus, which she drives toward the tower with Edna standing at the top. Just before impact, Charlie leaps from the bus and it explodes as it hits the tower. The scorched body of Edna tumbles to the ground and many of the girls cheer. Charlie crawls and before she dies shouts out, "See you in hell, Edna!". The final scene shows Jenny released and getting into a cab. She waves at Dr. Norton, who is implied to be in charge of the new, more benevolent order at the school, and three other girls who are still incarcerated.

== Cast ==
- Linda Carol as Jenny
- Wendy O. Williams as Charlie Chambliss
- Pat Ast as Edna Dawson
- Sybil Danning as Warden Sutter
- Charlotte McGinnis as Dr. Norton
- Sherri Stoner as Lisa
- Denise Gordy as Claudie
- Laurie Schwartz as Nicky
- Tiffany Helm as Andrea "Fish" Eldridge
- Darcy DeMoss as Karen "Knox" Charmin
- Andrea Darnell as Paula
- Robin Watkins as Kelly
- Winifred Freedman as Terri

== Production ==
Tom DeSimone said all of the actresses were well aware that there would be nudity in this movie, particularly shower scenes. "This was all agreed upon before signing on. If you couldn't handle being nude on the set, there was no contract. I didn't want certain girls excluded from being nude out of respect for the ones who were willing. It wouldn't have been fair, so everyone had to agree to be nude at one point or another," he said.

== Soundtrack ==
The soundtrack for the film was released by Rhino Records. It contains four songs by Wendy O. Williams; "It's My Life", "Bad Girl", "Goin' Wild", and the title song "Reform School Girls" recorded for the film.

== Reception ==
Reform School Girls received a negative to mixed critical reception. The film holds a 25% rating on review aggregator site Rotten Tomatoes based on eight reviews.
