= Plasmatics =

American punk rock band

- The Plasmatics filming a music video in New York City in 1980. From left to right: Richie Stotts, Stu Deutsch, Wes Beech, Wendy O. Williams and Jean Beauvoir.

Background information
- Origin: New York City, U.S.
- Genres: Punk rock; hardcore punk; heavy metal; shock rock
- Years active: 1978–1983, 1987–1988
- Labels: Stiff; Capitol; Profile
- Past members: Wendy O. Williams; Wes Beech; Chris Romanelli; Michael Ray; Ray Callahan; Richie Stotts; Chosei Funahara; Stu Deutsch; Jean Beauvoir; Joey Reese; T.C. Tolliver; Greg Smith; Tony Petri
- Website: plasmatics.com

The Plasmatics were an American punk rock and heavy metal band formed by Rod Swenson and Wendy O. Williams in New York City in 1978. They were a controversial group known for chaotic, destructive live shows and outrageous theatrics. These included chainsawing guitars, destroying speaker cabinets, sledgehammering television sets and blowing up automobiles live on stage. Williams was arrested in Milwaukee by the Milwaukee Police before being charged with public indecency.

The Plasmatics' career spanned five studio albums and multiple EPs. The band was composed of lead vocalist Wendy O. Williams and various other musicians rotating behind her over time. Aside from Williams and manager Rod Swenson, guitarist Wes Beech was the only other permanent member of the group. Guitarist Richie Stotts was a co-founder of the band and a mainstay of the pre-breakup core group (1978–1983). After the full breakup of the band following the release of Coup d'etat, Stotts was edited out of band videos and was not referred to by name in a 2006 compilation DVD released by Plasmatics Media LLC (via plasmatics.com).

== History ==
=== Formation and early years (1977–1979) ===
In 1977, Rod Swenson, who received his Master of Fine Arts in 1969 from Yale University where he specialized in conceptual art, performance art, and neo-dada art, holding the view that the measure of true or high art is how confrontational it is. He began a series of counter-culture projects which, by the mid-'70s, found him in the heart of Times Square producing experimental counterculture theater as well as video and shows with the likes of the then-little-known bands The Dead Boys, The Ramones, Patti Smith, and others. It was there that he met Wendy O. Williams after Williams found a copy of Show Business Weekly someone had discarded on the bus station floor. The issue lay open to a page with an ad in the casting calls section for Swenson's theater show Captain Kink's Sex Fantasy Theater. She answered the ad and applied for a job.

Williams and Swenson began auditioning potential band members in 1977 and, in July 1978, the Plasmatics gave their first public performance at what had become the rock shrine CBGB on New York City's Bowery. The earliest version of the band was a three-piece put together with a strong emphasis on visuals. The band quickly realized they needed another guitarist to hold them together musically. Guitarist Wes Beech joined the group and he would become, after Williams, the only permanent member of the band playing or touring behind or involved in the production of every Plasmatics and Wendy O. Williams record ever recorded.

The Plasmatics performing in 1979

From their initial gig at CBGB, the Plasmatics quickly rose in the New York City punk underground scene of the time. From playing a single weekday night, they moved quickly to playing repeated stands of four nights straight with two sold-out shows each night. They had lines stretching around the block and brought more fans into CBGB during this time than any other band. The group quickly outgrew CBGB. The band's stage show soon became notorious with acts such as chainsawing guitars in half part of their performance. Jim Farber of Sounds described the show: "Lead singer/ex-porn star/current weightlifter Wendy Orleans Williams (W.O.W. for short) spends most of the Plasmatics' show fondling her family size breasts, scratching her sweaty snatch and eating the drum kit, among other playful events".

Rod Swenson soon made a deal to book what was then a little-known polka hall called Irving Plaza from the Polish War Veterans who ran it at the time. The band repeatedly sold out the venue, with the Plasmatics helping to give Irving Plaza national recognition and launch it on the path to becoming an established rock venue in New York City. Having then caught the attention of important people in the entertainment world of New York City, the Plasmatics headlined the Palladium on November 16, 1979, the first group in history to do so at full ticket prices and without a major label recording contract.

=== New Hope for the Wretched, Beyond the Valley of 1984 and Metal Priestess (1980–1981) ===
The Plasmatics were soon selling out shows in Philadelphia, Boston, venues in New Jersey, and elsewhere in the Northeast. Chris Knowles of Classic Rock magazine wrote: the Plasmatics "were the biggest live attraction in New York... and the media was on them like white on rice... It's one thing to play at subversiveness, but The Plasmatics, unlike other Punk bands... put their Punk philosophy into action." Many U.S. record labels were reluctant to sign the band; The band was signed by Stiff Records, a British label, in March 1980, and appeared on the cover of Sounds in June of that year. Artists and Repertoire (A&R) from Stiff Records flew to New York City to see a show in person to determine if what they had been reading and hearing could possibly be real. The day after seeing the performance, Stiff put in an offer and a deal was inked within a month. A few months later, The Plasmatics began to record songs in New York City for what would become the album New Hope for the Wretched. As creative decisions go, Stiff's choice to ask long-time Rolling Stones producer Jimmy Miller to be behind the console for these recordings was not the best.

In addition to songs like "Corruption" and "Living Dead" – linked to TV smashing and automobile destruction – "Butcher Baby" featured a chainsaw sawing through a guitar, in place of a guitar solo, which was replicated during live shows. The Plasmatics visited the UK for a tour, which met with opposition from some quarters including the Greater London Council (GLC), particularly for their intention to blow up a car on stage and Williams' semi-nudity. The GLC canceled the band's show at the Hammersmith Odeon after fire inspectors decided the show would not meet safety requirements, although police had already arrived to disperse the gathering crowd before the decision had officially been taken. (Williams, recalled Debbie Harry in 2014, "was such a big deal back then. She showed her tits and she blew up cars on stage and broke TVs – and now it would just be normal.") Released as a single by Stiff Records, "Butcher Baby" reached No. 55 on the UK Singles Chart.

Stiff America had scheduled a release and a US tour. To capitalize on the band's popularity, the US edition of the album was packaged with a poster for the canceled Hammersmith Odeon show and an insert for the Plasmatics Secret Service, the official fan club. The album reached No. 55 on the UK Albums Chart. The band was set to tour the West Coast for the first time after the London cancellation and get their momentum back. To kick off the tour, Williams drove a Cadillac towards a stage at a free concert on New York City's Pier 62 loaded with explosives, jumping out moments before the car would hit the stage, blowing up all the equipment. The permits needed for this were hard to get and only allowed for an estimated 5–6,000 people. The day of the performance, 10,000 showed up, jamming the downtown streets and lining the rooftops. Even though it cost virtually the entire advance for the US release of New Hope for the Wretched to do it, Williams was quoted by a reporter from the Associated Press as saying, "It was worth it because it showed that these are just things and... people shouldn't worship them," a point she'd repeat more than once.

The Plasmatics' debut in Los Angeles was at the famed Whisky a Go Go. The show was originally planned for only two nights but was later expanded to four due to large sold-out crowds.

The ABC show Fridays, which was looking to be a more cutting-edge version of Saturday Night Live, booked Williams and the Plasmatics to appear in late December to go live on national TV.

In January 1981, Williams' stage performance in Milwaukee led to her arrest on charges of indecency after she reportedly "simulated masturbation with a sledge hammer in front of an audience". After objecting to being searched she was thrown to the ground and reportedly kicked in the face (later requiring a dozen stitches), with manager Rod Swenson also beaten unconscious when he tried to intervene. Williams was charged with battery of a police officer, resisting arrest, and "conduct in violation of a Milwaukee city ordinance pertaining to establishments that sell liquor", with Swenson also charged, but both were later cleared of all charges. A subsequent performance at The Palms nightclub sold out, and passed without incident, although the venue was raided after the show by the vice squad, with more than 30 police officers in attendance in case of trouble. Williams was also arrested on obscenity charges in Cleveland, but she was again acquitted.

A second album was long overdue but due to the ongoing legal battles and the Miller debacle with the first album, which was costly both in terms of time and money, it was agreed that this one had to be lean and mean. Bruce Kirkland at Stiff agreed to put up the funds as long as Swenson produced and the album was done in less than three weeks at a quarter of the cost of the first.

Given the recent turn of events, Swenson proposed the name Beyond the Valley of 1984. The tour, in 1981, became "The 1984 World Tour". In between touring drummers, Alice Cooper's Neal Smith was brought in to drum on the record. The album, with its Orwellian and apocalyptic theme, and songs such as "Masterplan", "Pig is a Pig" and "Sex Junkie", was released a few months later. During the album's recording, the Plasmatics were booked on Tom Snyder's late night TV show, on which the host introduced them as possibly "the greatest punk rock band in the entire world." Recording engineer Eddie Ciletti mixed the record at the Ranch recording studio in New York as well as the TV sound for the Snyder performance.

The album cover for Beyond the Valley was photographed in the Arizona desert where Williams appears on horseback with the band (without a drummer) as the "Four Horsemen of the Apocalypse".

The 1984 World Tour continued with the bold slogan "Down On Your Knees and Pledge Allegiance!".

During the last part of the tour, Swenson was contacted by American singer, songwriter and record producer Dan Hartman's office, asking for a meeting with Williams and Swenson. Hartman, who produced 38 Special, James Brown, and others, had been working on a session in LA when he picked up Beyond the Valley of 1984 and could not stop playing it. He felt it was "groundbreaking". He said, "I knew I wanted to meet these people and do something with them." Hartman came down to the Tribeca loft, met Williams and Swenson, and a month later he and Swenson were working on the production of the Metal Priestess mini-LP. The band needed more product but another album was premature, partly because Capitol Records was now making overtures for the next one. Bruce Kirkland at Stiff was ready to release it and that summer Metal Priestess was recorded at Hartman's private studio off his schoolhouse-turned-home in Connecticut. Released early that fall, Metal Priestess saw the band move closer to heavy metal, and included new members Chris "Junior" Romanelli (replacing Jean Beauvoir) and Joey Reese.

In October 1981, the band made an appearance on the Fishin' Musician segment of SCTV on NBC, shortly after the release of Metal Priestess.

=== Coup d'Etat (1982–1983) ===
By the spring of 1982, a worldwide deal was signed with Capitol Records, and Dan Hartman offered to produce a demo of the album for Capitol with Swenson at Electric Lady Studios, Jimi Hendrix's old studio, in New York. The whole album was arranged, recorded and mixed within a week. Dieter Dierks, who had just come off a number one album with Scorpions, also expressed interest in producing.

Coup d'Etat was a breakthrough album that began to blend the punk and metal genres, something that would later be done by bands such as S.O.D., Anthrax, and the Cro-Mags by the end of the 1980s. Williams also broke ground for her unique singing style. She pushed her voice so hard she had to make trips into Cologne, Germany, where the album was being recorded, each day for treatments to avoid permanent damage to her vocal cords.

The Hartman demo was released 20 years later under the name Coup de Grace. The rawer version of Coup d'Etat, which took less than a tenth of the time and a fraction of the budget, is hailed by many fans as the true version of the album.

The video Swenson produced and directed of "The Damned" featured Williams driving a school bus through a wall of TVs, climbing onto the roof of a moving bus which had been loaded with explosives, and then singing from the roof and jumping off a few moments before the bus goes through the second wall of TVs and then blows sky high.

As touring began, it became clear that Capitol was beginning to turn away from the group in favor of groups such as Duran Duran, who could generate ten times the sales with none of the political liability and fallout. Soon after the album was released, Capitol Records dropped the Plasmatics.

In 1982, Lemmy of Motörhead was approached by his label to do a follow-up to his successful Motörhead/Girlschool collaboration, St. Valentine's Day Massacre EP and Motörhead's manager Doug Smith got in touch with Rod Swenson in the States and proposed a duet of the country classic "Stand by Your Man" by Williams and Lemmy. The B-side would have two tracks, the Plasmatics' "Masterplan" sung by Lemmy and Motörhead's "No Class" sung by Williams. The A-side would have Williams and Lemmy in a duet of the title track of the EP.

Tracked at a Canadian recording studio, the Stand by Your Man sessions proved to be tumultuous as guitarist Eddie Clarke (who was producing the tracks, but not playing on them) quit Motörhead in the middle of the project. Rod Swenson and Dan Hartman, who had finished demoing the Plasmatics Coup d'Etat album together, were called upon to finish the rough and raw project in the mix which they did at Electric Lady Studios in New York. Swenson then shot the cover with Lemmy and Williams on it and the raw project was put out by Bronze records.

=== Hiatus and Wendy O. Williams' solo career (1984–1986) ===
In 1982, Kiss asked for Williams and the Plasmatics to appear as a special guest on their tour. Kiss wanted the controversial street edge that Williams would bring as part of their tour and for the Plasmatics it was a chance to play in front of different audiences in different markets than they would ordinarily play. By the end of the tour with Kiss it was clear that, although the formal notice that Capitol would not pick up their option for a second album did not come in for six months, the relationship with Capitol was done. It had taken months for the deal to be done, months to record and release the album and now months to get out of the deal. Gene Simmons approached Williams and Swenson about producing the next Wendy O. Williams album. To avoid any wasted time in legal issues with Capitol Records, it was decided not to use the Plasmatics name on the record at all and was simply called WOW, the initials of Wendy O. Williams. Gene Simmons felt it would give him the freedom he wanted to add more new players to the album.

Wes Beech remained to play rhythm and lead and T.C. Tolliver, the drummer on Coup d'Etat, remained to play on the new album. Gene Simmons played bass under the pseudonym of "Reginald Van Helsing". The only other new player on the album was lead guitarist Michael Ray, brought in to solve the technical challenges that had been a problem for several albums and had come to a head with the more complex music of Coup D'Etat. Simmons also pulled in the talents of Ace Frehley, who had not played with Kiss since leaving the band years before, Paul Stanley, and then-current Kiss drummer Eric Carr and guitarist Vinnie Vincent each did one song as guests. The record was released on Passport (international and U.S. distribution by JEM).

Review copies were sent out to the various media outlets. Malcolm Dome, a reviewer for Kerrang! magazine, had picked the WOW album as his album of the year. Williams received a Grammy nomination for 'Best Female Rock Vocal' in 1985.

With Mohawks now starting to become common, Williams decided to let her hair grow in, and the cover Swenson shot for what would be called the "album of the year" in the pages of Kerrang! was the opposite of the earlier covers; total simplicity.

Wes Beech took a sabbatical for personal reasons and would not accompany the band on the next tour. The band decided to return to being a three-piece. Beech came in as associate producer with Swenson on the album and worked on writing, arranging and recording, but the recording would be Ray, Tolliver, and Greg Smith (who would go on to play with Alice Cooper, Ritchie Blackmore and others and who had been brought in as the touring bassist for the WOW album). There was tremendous excitement in tackling the project as a kind of minimalist, stripped down concept, or rite of purification. The songs, including the lyrics, would also be minimalistic or archetypal, again giving Williams a chance to take her vocals a step further. The tempo of the WOW album had been slower than previous albums in an effort to open it up, but the new album Kommander of Kaos (a.k.a. KOK) was to bring back the speed and then some. Songs would be played at breakneck speeds, with screaming leads and vocals. The recording was done in Fairfield, New Jersey at the giant Broccoli Rabe Recording complex which would be home to several Wendy O./Plasmatics Projects including three studio albums with what the group fondly called "The Fairfield Sound".

=== Maggots: The Record (1987–1988) ===
Beech had rejoined the band to both tour and play on the next album where the re-formed four-piece band became a centerpiece for perhaps the most complex arrangements in the band's career. After the archetypal minimalism, both lyrically and musically of Kommander, the new album, which would again carry the Plasmatics name, was filled with complexity and returned to the social and political themes previously found most strongly in Coup but also in 1984 before it: environmental decay and a world where excess and abuse led directly to a doomsday scenario.

Maggots: The Record was recorded in 1987 and set 25 years in a future where environmental abuse and the burning of fossil fuels have created a greenhouse effect leading to an end of the world scenario. Called by many the first "thrash metal opera", the central theme of the album is an end of the world scenario that follows from genetic engineering and global warming, something that was not at all part of the general public awareness of the time. A group of scientists trying to eliminate pollution in the rivers and oceans develop an RNA retrovirus designed to eat it all up and then die once the pollution has been consumed. But global warming leading to the flooding of land areas instead puts the virus in contact with the "common maggot" leading to a mutated form of maggot that doubles in size with each generation looking for more and more things to consume. In the "end of the world" finale, cities are being destroyed and humans consumed by giant maggots a horrific metaphorical end to a world blind to human consumption and environmental destruction.

The album features various scenes of The White Family over the course of three days. The family is devoured while watching a TV game show. Valerie, the girlfriend of hot-shot television reporter Bruce is devoured by three massive maggots while lying in her boyfriend's bed. The final scene has Cindy White trying to fight off the attacking maggots and running out onto a fire escape where she sees the crowded streets below as the record shows the entire human population is headed for imminent annihilation. The album was on the WOW label; distributed by Profile Records in the U.S. and overseas by GWR Records, which had been started by Motörhead's longtime manager Doug Smith.

Williams did a performance piece to inaugurate the album at New York City's Palladium, which had been transformed from a proscenium theater into a huge multi-level club where she sledgehammered and chainsawed to smithereens a facsimile all-American living room. "Maggots: The Tour" began a week later using the Plasmatics name for the first time in two albums with slogans such as "Those Now Eating Will Soon Be Eaten," "The Day of the Humans is Gone," and lyrics such as "soldiers for the DNA dissidents are put away, dragged off in the dead of night, disappear without a sight". Rear screen projectors ran film of human disasters, fascists and other historical horrors, environmental carnage and human rights violations on huge screens behind the band during all the songs from the Maggots album.

A review in Kerrang! came out shortly thereafter: A 5 out of 5 Ks, "Quite simply a masterpiece... a work of genius." Williams' vocal work "reduces Celtic Frost's Tom G. Warrior's 'death grunts' to mere whimpers" it went on coupled with "a mixture of hedonistic operatic melodies..gut forged to some of the heaviest armadillo beats you're ever like to hear committed to vinyl."

== Band members ==
=== Musicians ===
Final lineup

- Wendy O. Williams – vocals, saxophone (1978–1983, 1987–1988; died 1998)
- Wes Beech – guitar (1979–1983, 1987–1988), keyboards (1979–1983, 1987–1988)
- Chris Romanelli – bass (1981–1983, 1987–1988), keyboards (1981–1983, 1987–1988)
- Michael Ray – guitar (1987–1988)
- Ray Callahan – drums (1987–1988; died 2023)

Former

- Richie Stotts – guitar (1978–1983)
- Chosei Funahara – bass (1978–1980)
- Jean Beauvoir – bass, keyboards (1980–1981)
- Greg Smith – bass (1983)
- Stu Deutsch – drums (1978–1981)
- Joey Reese – drums (1981–1982)
- Tony Petri - drums (1981, died 2024)
- T.C. Tolliver – drums (1982–1983)

=== Personnel ===
- George Pierson – tour/sound manager
- Jim Cherry – road manager
- Jim Kramer – booking agent
- Pyro Pete Cappadocia – live pyrotechnics
- Mick "Agent Orange" Bello – roadie

== Discography ==
=== Studio albums ===
- New Hope for the Wretched (1980)
- Beyond the Valley of 1984 (1981)
- Coup d'etat (1982)
- Maggots: The Record (1987)
- Coup de Grace (2000)

=== EPs ===
- Butcher Baby (1978)
- Dream Lover (1979)
- Monkey Suit (1980)
- Metal Priestess (1981)
