= Richie Stotts =

American rock musician

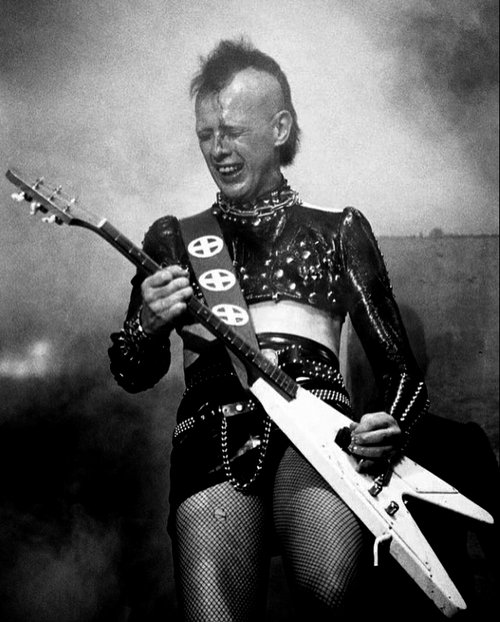
- Richie on stage Perkins Place 1981

Background information
- Born: October 27, 1953 (age 73); New York City, New York, US
- Genres: Hard rock; Heavy metal; Punk rock; Shock rock; Rap rock
- Occupations: Musician; Singer; Songwriter
- Instruments: Guitar; Vocals; Piano; Pedal Steel Guitar; Mini Synthesizer; Clarinet
- Years active: 1970–present
- Formerly of: The Plasmatics, King Flux
- Spouse: Carla Lother (m. 2008)
- Website: richiestotts.com

Richard Eugene Stotts (born 27 October 1953) (better known as Richie Stotts) is a New York City born musician who began writing and performing in a fledgling 1970s NYC band named “The Numbers”. Richie’s songwriting skills and lead guitar playing experience ultimately led to him becoming one of the founding members of the groundbreaking and inimitable punk metal group, Plasmatics.

In 1978, Richie was among the earliest musicians to sport a Mohawk, taking inspiration from the Travis Bickle character in the movie Taxi Driver. In an effort to keep up with his constantly outrageous stage mate Wendy O. Williams, he would also cross dress in various items like a nurse's uniform, a tutu, a wedding dress and a French maid.

After leaving the Plasmatics in 1984, Richie pursued a solo career with his band King Flux and a graduate degree in Geology. Richie appears in a brief cameo in the Kim Basinger movie 9½ Weeks. He's recognizable by the blonde mohawk and chainsaw tattoo in a party scene.

He was a great friend of Joey Ramone and was one of several speakers at a CBGB's all-star tribute put on by Mickey Leigh, Joey's brother, in 2001. Dee Dee Ramone was also a friend, the two composed "Punishment Fits the Crime" which appeared on the 1989 Brain Drain album by the Ramones.

In 2004, he collaborated with singer-songwriter and wife Carla Lother on several songs for her 100 Lovers album.

Professional skateboarder Jeff Grosso shaved off his eyebrows in Santa Cruz Skateboards' video Speed Freaks, which he later said was inspired by Stotts.

== King Flux ==
King Flux
- Also known as: Hill-Fire
- Origin: United States
- Genre: Rock
- Past members: Richie Stotts; Billy Hilfiger; Andy Hilfiger; Marky Ramone; Chris Romanelli; Christopher Bell; Tony Petri; Albert Bouchard

King Flux was a band started by Stotts after the breakup of the Plasmatics in 1985. King Flux's first incarnation consisted of Richie on guitar, Billy and Andy Hilfiger (younger brothers of fashion designer Tommy Hilfiger), and Marky Ramone on drums. Apparently, they also played under the name Hill-Fire. Other people played with the band throughout its short existence including Chris "Junior" Romanelli on bass guitar, Christopher Bell (currently with The Freddie Long Band) on guitar, and Tony Petri (from Twisted Sister) and Albert Bouchard of Blue Öyster Cult on drums. Also, Zippy McAdam, from NYC, played bass with King Flux, appearing on the Uncle Floyd show,.

== Discography ==
As with King Flux: The Man with the X-Ray Eyes/1944 - This was the only vinyl release by King Flux, a 7" single. The B-Side consisted of the song "1944". The lineup on the single was Richie Stotts on guitar and vocals, Chris "Junior" Romanelli on bass guitar and Albert Bouchard on drums. Richie produced the single. It was released by the American Gothic Record Company and distributed by Dutch East India. Tommy Lafferty was one of the original guitarists.
