= Michael Schermick =

- Also known as: Michael Kelly Smith
- Born: October 21, 1958 (age 67); Pennsylvania, U.S.
- Genres: Glam metal, hard rock
- Occupation: Musician
- Instrument: Guitar

Michael Schermick (born October 21, 1958), known professionally as Michael Kelly Smith, is an American guitarist who played for the glam metal bands Cinderella and Britny Fox. Schermick and drummer Tony Destra were fired from Cinderella in 1985 at the request of the record label, Polygram.

Following his departure from Cinderella, he again teamed with Destra, along with Dean Davidson and Billy Childs to form Britny Fox, becoming their lead guitarist. Following Destra's untimely death in 1987 from a car accident, the band recruited drummer Johnny Dee, completing what would become their classic lineup. Schermick played on every album released by Britny Fox.

Prior to Cinderella and Britny Fox, Michael had been a guitarist in the bands Atlantic Star, Telapath, Psychopath, Diamonds, Saints in Hell and The Priscilla Hairriett Band.

He also played in a band known as Razamanaz featuring Cory Massi on lead vocals and guitar, Joe Bisbing on bass, and Steve Attig on drums.

He later began teaching guitar in Horsham, Pennsylvania.

== Discography ==
=== With Cinderella ===
- "Shake Me"/"Nobody's Fool" (7") 1983.
- Demos

=== With Britny Fox ===
- Britny Fox (1988)
- Boys In Heat (1989)
- Bite Down Hard (1991)
- Springhead Motorshark (2003)

=== With Razamanaz ===
- Razamanaz (2003)
