= Metal Queen – B-Sides & Rarities =

Metal Queen - B-Sides & Rarities

Compilation album by Doro
- Released: 2007
- Genre: Hard rock, heavy metal
- Length: 149:33
- Label: No Remorse / SPV/Steamhammer

Doro chronology
All We Are – The Fight (2007)	Metal Queen - B-Sides & Rarities (2007)	Anthems for the Champion – The Queen (2007)

Metal Queen – B-Sides & Rarities is a double CD compilation album released in 2007 under the label No Remorse Records, containing songs of the German hard rock singer Doro Pesch. It is unclear if this is a fully licensed compilation, an unofficial release or even a pirated publication. The album is not present in the discography section of Doro's official site and Discogs lists the album as an "unofficial release pretending to be released under No Remorse Records label". On the contrary, Encyclopaedia Metallum lists it as an official compilation.

As of 2010, this is the only compilation collecting many b-sides of Doro's EPs and singles, as well as songs performed by Doro in other compilations and in albums by other artists.

== Track listing ==
=== CD 1 ===
1. "I Adore You" (B-side of the single "White Wedding", 2000) - 3:23
2. "I Want More" (bonus track of the album Calling the Wild European edition, 2000) - 2:31
3. "Alone Again" (feat. Lemmy Kilmister, bonus track of the album Calling the Wild European edition, 2000) - 4:26
4. "Children of the Night" (B-side of the single "Bad Blood", 1993) - 4:18
5. "Dirty Diamonds" (B-side of the single "In Freiheit Stirbt Mein Herz", 1995) - 4:15
6. "In Freiheit Stirbt Mein Herz" (Heart Version) (B-side of the single "In Freiheit Stirbt Mein Herz", 1995) - 5:29
7. "Kiss of Fire" (from the EP Love Me in Black, 1998) - 5:01
8. "Love Me in Black" (Electric Radio Track) (from the EP Love Me in Black, 1998) - 4:03
9. "Pain" (from the album Calling the Wild US edition, 2000) - 4:13
10. "You Got Me Singing" (B-side of the single "In Freiheit Stirbt Mein Herz", 1995) - 4:46
11. "Terrorvision" (Desert Storm Remix) (from the EP Love Me in Black, 1998) - 3:42
12. "Tie Me Up" (Hard and Fast Mix) (B-side of the single "Ceremony", 1995) - 5:16
13. "Egypt (The Chains Are On)" (cover of Dio song, taken from the compilation Holy Dio, 1999) - 6:11
14. "Burn It Up (Bird of Fire)" (Lighting Strikes Again Mix) (B-side of the single "Burn It Up", 2000) - 2:43
15. "For Love and Friendship" (bonus track of the album Warrior Soul Japanese edition, 2006) - 3:40
16. "Rip Me Apart" (B-side of the single "Ich Will Alles", 2000) - 3:44
17. "Rock Angel" (B-side of the single "Last Day of My Life", 1993) - 3:52

=== CD 2 ===
1. "Lonely Wolf" (bonus track of the album Warrior Soul Japanese edition, 2006) - 4:04
2. "Ceremony" (Original Mix) (B-side of the single "Ceremony", 1995) - 4:00
3. "On My Own" (feat. Marc Storace and Luke Gasser, from the EP All We Are – The Fight, 2007) - 3:45
4. "Everything's Lost" (from the EP All We Are - The Fight, 2007) - 3:57
5. "All We Are" (Live) (from the EP All We Are - The Fight, 2007) - 3:08
6. "Never Get Out of This World Alive" (from the EP In Liebe und Freundschaft, 2005) - 3:40
7. "Thunderspell" (Live) (from the EP All We Are - The Fight, 2007) - 4:45
8. "Babe I'm Gonna Leave You" (from the EP All We Are - The Fight, 2007) - 7:15
9. "Rare Diamond" (Live) (B-side of the single "Enough For You", 1993) - 3:23
10. "Shed No Tears" (from Crown of Thorns album Karma, 2002) - 4:43
11. "The Fortuneteller" (Live) (B-side of the single "Enough For You", 1993) - 7:03
12. "Ceremony" (Mix Long Extended Hammer Version by Die Krupps) (B-side of the single "Ceremony", 1995) - 5:08
13. "Song for Me" (Acoustic Version) (bonus track of the album Fight limited edition, 2002) - 4:34
14. "Angel in the Dark" (bonus track of the album Warrior Soul limited edition, 2006) - 4:20
15. "1999" (bonus track of the album Warrior Soul limited edition, 2006) - 7:54
16. "USA National Offense" (B-side of the single "Burn It Up", 2000) - 1:40
17. "Wings of Freedom" (from German Rock Stars Project single Wings of Freedom, 2001, feat. Andi Deris, Mat Sinner, Ralf Scheepers, Lenny Wolf, Michael Voss etc.) - 4:41
