= 20 Years – A Warrior Soul =

20 Years - A Warrior Soul

Video by Doro
- Released: 24 November 2006
- Recorded: Phillips Halle, Düsseldorf, Germany, 13 December 2003
- Genre: Heavy metal
- Length: 365 min.
- Label: AFM
- Director: Ronald Matthes
- Producer: Ronald Matthes, Nils Wasko, Sandra Eichner

Doro video chronology
| Classic Diamonds – The DVD (2004) | 20 Years - A Warrior Soul (2006) | 25 Years in Rock... and Still Going Strong (2010) |

20 Years – A Warrior Soul is a double DVD video album by hard rock singer Doro Pesch, released in 2006 by AFM Records. The first DVD contains a movie shot by director Ronald Matthes during the tour supporting the release of the album Warrior Soul in 2006; it features also a selection of commented songs from the special concert held at Phillips Halle in Düsseldorf, Germany on 13 December 2003, celebrating 20 years of career of the German singer with many guests, and footage of the party after the show. The second DVD features the full 20th anniversary concert.

The double DVD package was also marketed as 20 Years - A Warrior Soul – Winter Edition, with a different cover and the inclusion of a bonus CD.

== Track listings ==
=== DVD One ===
Warrior Soul - On the Road

- Intro
- "Earthshaker Rock"
- Doro Rocks Hamburg
- "Haunted Heart"
- From Hamburg to Helmond - The Twilight Zone
- "You're My Family"
- Hot in Helmond / Metal Mayhem in Madrid
- "True as Steel"
- From Madrid to Barcelona - Metal Man Saves Two Souls
- "Above the Ashes"
- Goodbye Barcelona - Hello Langen
- "Strangers Yesterday"
- "Für Immer" ('Forever')
- Langen Farewell
- "Love Me in Black"
- Russia Special Part 1
- "My Majesty"
- "Warrior Soul"
- Russia Special Part 2
- "All We Are"
- Outro

20 Years Anniversary - The Movie

1. "Intro"
2. "I Rule the Ruins"
3. "Always Live to Win"
4. "Metal Racer"
5. "East Meets West" (feat. Udo Dirkschneider)
6. "Out of Control"
7. "Bad Blood" (feat. Blaze Bayley)
8. "Tausend Mal Gelebt" ('Lived a Thousand Times')
9. "White Wedding" (feat. Jean Beauvoir)
10. "Egypt - The Chains Are On"
11. "A Whiter Shade of Pale"
12. "Hellbound"
13. "You've Got Another Thing Coming" (feat. Saxon)
14. "Fall for Me Again"
15. "Unholy Love"
16. "Fight for Rock" (feat. Warlock)
17. "Love Me Forever" (feat. Lemmy Kilmister & Mikkey Dee)
18. "Für Immer" ('Forever')
19. "Born to Be Wild" (feat. Claus Lessmann)
20. "All We Are" and Aftershow (feat. Lemy Kilmister, Mikkey Dee, Jean Beauvoir, Udo Dirkschneider, Saxon, Blaze Bayley, Warlock, Claus Lessmann, Circle II Circle)

=== DVD Two ===
20 Years Anniversary - The Concert

1. "Intro"
2. "I Rule the Ruins"
3. "Always Live to Win"
4. "Metal Racer"
5. "Hellbound"
6. "True as Steel"
7. "Burning the Witches"
8. "Hellraiser"
9. "East Meets West" (feat. Udo Dirkschneider)
10. "Metal Tango"
11. "Out of Control"
12. "Unholy Love"
13. "A Whiter Shade of Pale"
14. "Whenever I Think of You"
15. "Für Immer" ('Forever')
16. "Fall for Me Again"
17. "Tausend Mal Gelebt" ('Lived a Thousand Times')
18. "White Wedding" (feat. Jean Beauvoir)
19. "Drum solo"
20. "Bad Blood" (feat. Blaze Bayley)
21. "Egypt - The Chains Are On"
22. "Brutal and Effective"
23. "Love Me in Black"
24. "Earthshaker Rock"
25. "Love Me Forever" (feat. Lemmy Kilmister & Mikkey Dee)
26. "Fight"
27. "Burn It Up" (feat. Rhein Fire)
28. "You've Got Another Thing Coming" (feat. Saxon)
29. "Alles Ist Gut" ('Everything Is Good')
30. "All Night" (feat. Warlock)
31. "Fight for Rock" (feat. Warlock)
32. "Evil" (Feat. Warlock)
33. "Born to Be Wild" (feat. Claus Lessmann)
34. "All We Are" (feat. Lemmy Kilmister, Mikkey Dee, Jean Beauvoir, Udo Dirkschneider, Saxon, Blaze Bayley, Warlock Guys, Circle II Circle)

=== Winter edition CD ===
1. "Everything's Lost" - 3:53
2. "You're My Family" (live) - 4:23
3. "My Majesty" (live) - 4:36
4. "Above the Ashes" (live) - 4:33
5. "Für Immer" ('Forever') (live) - 7:15

== Personnel ==
=== Band members ===
- Doro Pesch - vocals
- Joe Taylor - guitars, backing vocals
- Oliver Palotai - keyboards, guitars, backing vocals
- Nick Douglas - bass, keyboards, backing vocals
- Johnny Dee - drums, backing vocals

=== Warlock members ===
- Doro Pesch - vocals
- Peter Szigeti - guitars
- Niko Arvanitis - guitars
- Frank Rittel - bass, backing vocals
- Michael Eurich - drums
