= Youth Gone Wild: Heavy Metal Hits of the '80s =

Series of compilation albums

Youth Gone Wild: Heavy Metal Hits of the '80s is a series of compilation albums of heavy metal songs of the 1980s, the heyday of the genre. The title comes from the song by Skid Row, which does not appear in the series.

== Volume 1 ==
Youth Gone Wild: Heavy Metal Hits of the '80s, Volume 1

Compilation album by Various artists
- Released: March 26, 1996
- Genre: Heavy metal, hard rock, glam metal
- Label: Rhino Records

Professional ratings
Review scores
Source	Rating
Allmusic	4.5/5 stars

=== Track listing ===
1. "Rock You Like a Hurricane" – Scorpions 4:12
2. "Talk Dirty to Me" – Poison 3:45
3. "The Last in Line" – Dio 5:47
4. "Lay It Down" – Ratt 3:27
5. "Never Enough" – L.A. Guns 4:14
6. "Parental Guidance" – Judas Priest 3:26
7. "Blind in Texas" – W.A.S.P. 4:22
8. "Ace of Spades" – Motörhead 2:49
9. "Balls to the Wall" – Accept 5:43
10. "Street of Dreams" – Rainbow 4:28
11. "Screaming in the Night" – Krokus 6:40
12. "Summertime Girls" – Y&T 3:28
13. "We're Not Gonna Take It" – Twisted Sister 3:40
14. "Cum on Feel the Noize" – Quiet Riot 4:50

== Volume 2 ==
Youth Gone Wild: Heavy Metal Hits of the '80s, Volume 2

Compilation album by Various artists
- Released: March 26, 1996
- Label: Rhino Records

Professional ratings
Review scores
Source	Rating
Allmusic	4.5/5 stars

=== Track listing ===
1. "Rock Me" – Great White 7:18
2. "Heaven Tonight" – Yngwie J. Malmsteen & Rising Force 4:07
3. "The Final Countdown" – Europe 5:10
4. "Over My Head" – King's X 4:49
5. "Goin' Crazy!" – David Lee Roth 3:09
6. "It's Not Love" – Dokken 5:01
7. "Seventeen" – Winger 4:06
8. "Poison Ivy" – Faster Pussycat 4:27
9. "Gotta Let Go" – Lita Ford 4:40
10. "I Want Out" – Helloween 4:41
11. "I'm on to You" – Hurricane 3:59
12. "Edge of a Broken Heart" – Vixen 4:24
13. "Dreams in the Dark" – Badlands 3:30
14. "Wild Thing" – Sam Kinison 4:29

== Volume 3 ==
Youth Gone Wild: Heavy Metal Hits of the '80s, Vol. 3

Compilation album by Various artists
- Released: March 26, 1996
- Label: Rhino Records

Professional ratings
Review scores
Source	Rating
Allmusic	4.5/5 stars

=== Track listing ===
1. "Still of the Night" – Whitesnake 6:39
2. "Gypsy Road" – Cinderella 3:56
3. "Sleeping My Day Away" – D-A-D 4:24
4. "Wait" – White Lion 4:02
5. "Someone Like You" – Bang Tango 4:24
6. "Say What You Will" – Fastway 3:22
7. "Don't Dog Me" – Raging Slab 3:52
8. "Get It On" – Kingdom Come 4:23
9. "Heavy Metal Love" – Helix 3:01
10. "Rock Queen" – Love/Hate 2:22
11. "Scared" – Dangerous Toys 4:04
12. "Smooth up in Ya" – BulletBoys 4:26
13. "Girlschool" – Britny Fox 4:40
14. "Addicted to That Rush" – Mr. Big 4:46

== Volume 4 ==
Youth Gone Wild: Heavy Metal Hits of the '80s, Vol. 4

Compilation album by Various artists
- Released: June 16, 1998
- Label: Rhino Records

Professional ratings
Review scores
Source	Rating
Allmusic	3/5 stars

=== Track listing ===
1. "Up All Night" – Slaughter 4:20
2. "New Thing" – Enuff Z'Nuff 4:23
3. "10,000 Lovers (In One)" – TNT 2:57
4. "Walkin' Shoes" – Tora Tora 4:04
5. "Walls Come Down" – Every Mother's Nightmare 5:17
6. "Naughty Naughty" – Danger Danger 4:54
7. "Down Boys" – Warrant 4:04
8. "D'Stroll" – D'Molls 5:53
9. "Hollywood" – Junkyard 3:01
10. "Heartbreak Blvd" – Shotgun Messiah 4:20
11. "Future World" – Pretty Maids 5:21
12. "Set Me Free" – Heathen 3:48
13. "The Calling" – Leatherwolf 4:04
14. "Turn Up the Radio" – Autograph 4:37
15. "Badlands" – Metal Church 7:23
16. "To Hell With the Devil" – Stryper 4:05
