= Let Love Rain on Me =

EP by Doro
- Released: 9 August 2004
- Recorded: Studio 301, Major's Studio, Cologne, Germany
- Genres: Symphonic rock, acoustic rock
- Length: 23:49
- Label: AFM
- Producers: Chris Lietz, Torsten Sickert

Doro chronology
Fight (2002)	Let Love Rain on Me (2004)	Classic Diamonds (2004)

Professional ratings
Review scores
Source	Rating
Metal Hammer (GER)	5/7 stars

Let Love Rain on Me is an EP by German hard rock singer Doro Pesch, released in 2004 through AFM Records. It is an enhanced CD containing both musical tracks and a live video. The title track is present in three versions sung in English, Spanish and French. "Let Love Rain on Me", the Judas Priest cover "Breaking the Law" and the Warlock song "I Rule the Ruins" were played acoustically with a full orchestra and are featured in the following album Classic Diamonds in slightly different versions.

The EP reached position No. 65 in the German Singles chart and position No. 7 in the Spanish Singles chart.

== Track listing ==
No.	Title	Writer(s)	Length
1.	"Let Love Rain on Me" (Radio version)	Doro Pesch, Gary Scruggs	3:51
2.	"Llueva en Mi Tu Amor" (Spanish version)		3:51
3.	"Pluie d'Amour" (French version)		3:51
4.	"Breaking the Law" (Judas Priest cover)	K. K. Downing, Rob Halford, Glenn Tipton	4:22
5.	"I Rule the Ruins" (Radio version)	D. Pesch, Joey Balin	4:02
6.	"Rare Diamond" (live)	D. Pesch, Louis Lepore	3:38
7.	"Unholy Love" (live bonus video)		4:42

== Personnel ==
- Doro Pesch – vocals

=== The Classic Night Orchestra on tracks 1–5 ===
- Arnt Böhme – conductor, orchestral arrangements
- Hye-sin Tjo, Ardan Saguner, Nonna Parfenov, Elda Teqja, Marco Stankovic, Ingrid Illguth – first violins
- Carolin Kosa, Arhan Saguner, Emma Fridman, Jee-eun Lee, Alexander Schneider – second violins
- Wiebke Corssen, Urs Beckers, Kristina Iczque, Manuela Crespi – violas
- Lev Gordin (soloist), Martin Henneken, Jens Peter Jandausch, Luise Schroeter – violoncellos
- Milivoj Plavsic – contrabass
- Daniel Edelhoff, Jörg Brohm – first trumpets
- Wolfgang Mundt, Carsten Gronwald – second trumpets
- Andreas Roth, Peter Schatlo – trombones
- Jan Böhme – bass trombone
- Klaus 'Major' Heuser – acoustic guitars
- Wolf Simon – drums
- Mario Arrangonda – percussion

=== Additional musicians on track 6 ===
- Joe Taylor – acoustic guitar
- Nick Douglas – bass
- Johnny Dee – drums

== Charts ==
Chart (2004)	Peak position
Germany (GfK)	85
Spain (Promusicae)	7
