= Raise Your Fist in the Air =

EP by Doro
- Released: 3 August 2012
- Genre: Heavy metal
- Length: 15:48
- Label: Nuclear Blast

Doro chronology
Under My Skin: A Fine Selection of Doro Classics (2012)	Raise Your Fist in the Air (2012)	Raise Your Fist (2012)

Professional ratings
Review scores
Source	Rating
Metal Forces	7.5/10
ThisIsNotAScene	9.5/10 stars

Raise Your Fist in the Air is an EP by German hard rock and heavy metal artist Doro. It was released through Nuclear Blast on 3 August 2012.

== Track listing ==
No.	Title	Length
1.	"Raise Your Fist in the Air"	3:52
2.	"Victory"	3:08
3.	"Engel"	4:55
4.	"Lève ton poing vers le ciel"	3:53
Total length:		15:48

=== Vinyl track listing ===
Side A
No.	Title	Length
1.	"Raise Your Fist in the Air"
2.	"Victory"

Side B
No.	Title	Length
1.	"Engel"
2.	"Lève ton poing vers le ciel"

== Personnel ==
Band members

- Doro – vocals
- Bas Maas – guitars
- Luca Princiotta – guitars, keyboards
- Nick Douglas – bass
- Johnny Dee – drums

Technical personnel

- Geoffrey Gillespie – cover art

== Charts ==
Chart (2012)	Peak position
Germany (GfK)	78
