= Celebrate – The Night of the Warlock =

EP by Doro
- Released: 31 October 2008
- Recorded: W:A:T Factory, Bochum; TwoforMusic Studios, Cologne, Germany
- Genre: Heavy metal
- Length: 23:52
- Label: AFM
- Producer: Andreas Bruhn, Torsten Sickert, Doro Pesch

Doro chronology
Anthems for the Champion – The Queen (2007)	Celebrate – The Night of the Warlock (2008)	Herzblut (2008)

Professional ratings
Review scores
Source	Rating
Metal Hammer (GER)	5/7 stars

Celebrate – The Night of the Warlock is an EP by German hard rock singer Doro Pesch, released in 2008 through AFM Records. The EP was released a few months before the album Fear No Evil and includes three versions of the song "Celebrate". In the single version, the chorus features a group of Doro fans, while the other two versions include chorus vocals by Saxon's frontman Biff Byford and several female heavy metal singers. The song, a collaboration between Doro and her former Warlock producer Joey Balin, commemorates the 25th anniversary of Doro's career.

The EP reached position No. 75 in the German single chart.

== Track listing ==
1. "Celebrate" (single version) (Doro Pesch, Joey Balin) – 4:56
2. "Celebrate" (feat. Biff Byford) – 4:56
3. "Celebrate" (Full Metal Female version) – 4:56
4. "The Night of the Warlock" (single version) (Pesch, Chris Lietz) – 5:14
5. "Rescue Me" (Pesch, Jean Beauvoir) – 3:50

== Personnel ==
=== Band members ===
- Doro Pesch – vocals, producer
- Nick Douglas – bass
- Joe Taylor – guitars
- Johnny Dee – drums
- Oliver Palotai – keyboards, guitars
- Luca Princiotta – keyboards, guitars

=== Additional musicians ===
- Biff Byford – backing vocals on track 2
- Sabina Classen, Floor Jansen, Angela Gossow, Veronica Freeman, Liv Kristine, Ji-In Cho, Liv Jagrell, Girlschool – backing vocals on track 3
- Andreas Bruhn – guitars, bass, producer, engineer, mixing
- Chris Lietz – guitar, keyboards, engineer, mixing, mastering
- Torsten Sickert – keyboards, guitars, bass, programming, producer, engineer, mixing
- Klaus Vanscheidt – guitar, backing vocals
- Christoph Siemons – guitar, backing vocals
- Bernd Aufermann – guitar
- Lukas Dylong, Dirk Schoppen – backing vocals

== Charts ==
Chart (2008)	Peak position
Germany (GfK)	75
Spain (PROMUSICAE)	3
