= Girlschool (Britny Fox song) =

1988 song by Britny Fox

Single by Britny Fox

from the album Britny Fox
- Released: 1988
- Recorded: 1988
- Genre: Glam metal
- Songwriter(s): Dean Davidson

Britny Fox singles chronology
"Long Way to Love" (1988)	"Girlschool" (1988)	"Save the Weak" (1988)

"Girlschool" is a song by American pop-metal band Britny Fox, that was released in 1988 as a single. Its video became an MTV favorite, along with the video for Long Way to Love.

== Reception ==
In Jeremy Ulrey's review of Britny Fox, he listed "Girlschool" alongside "Long Way to Love" and "Gudbuy t'Jane", as highlights of the album. Doug Stone called it, "Fox's raison d'etre", in his review of their live album, Long Way to Live.

== Music video ==
Howard Johnson writing for Classic Rock ranked the song's video at No. 5 on their list of the Top 10 Best Hair Metal Videos.

Its video was also placed on New York Times list of the 15 Essential Hair-Metal Videos.

Stephen Thomas Erlewine, called the video a "great moment in pop-metal", and said that,"it remains one of the style's best moments."
