= Herzblut (Doro EP) =

EP by Doro
- Released: 12 December 2008
- Recorded: W:A:T Factory, Bochum; Eardrum Studios, Hamburg, Germany
- Genre: Heavy metal
- Length: 24:12
- Label: AFM
- Producers: Andreas Bruhn, Doro Pesch

Doro chronology
Celebrate – The Night of the Warlock (2008)	Herzblut (2008)	Fear No Evil (2009)

Herzblut is an EP by German female hard rock singer Doro, released in 2009 through AFM Records. The EP contains five version of the power ballad "Herzblut", also sung in French, Spanish and Portuguese. The EP was issued a few weeks before the album Fear No Evil in 2009.

The EP reached position No. 71 in the German singles chart.

== Track listing ==
1. "Herzblut" ('Passion') (single version) (Doro Pesch, Andreas Bruhn) – 3:43
2. "Herzblut" ('Passion') (album version) – 4:39
3. "A Fond Le Coeur" (Herzblut French version) – 3:59
4. "Te Doy Mi Corazón" (Herzblut Spanish version) – 4:39
5. "Eu Dou-Te O Meu Coração" (Herzblut Portuguese version) – 4:07
6. "Share My Fate" (Pesch, Torsten Sickert) – 3:05

== Personnel ==
=== Band members ===
- Doro Pesch – vocals, producer
- Nick Douglas – bass
- Joe Taylor – guitars
- Johnny Dee – drums
- Oliver Palotai – keyboards, guitars
- Luca Princiotta – keyboards, guitars

=== Additional musicians ===
- Andreas Bruhn – guitars, bass, producer, engineer, mixing
- Chris Lietz – guitar, keyboards, engineer, mixing
- Torsten Sickert – keyboards, guitars, bass, programming, engineer, mixing

== Charts ==
Chart (2008)	Peak position
Germany (GfK)	71
