= Classic Diamonds – The DVD =

Video by Doro with the Classic Night Orchestra
- Released: 13 December 2004
- Recorded: Wacken Open Air Festival, 6 August 2004; Cologne, Germany, 19 August 2004; Hamburg Docks, Germany, 24 October 2004
- Genre: Symphonic rock, heavy metal
- Length: ≈ 182:00
- Label: AFM
- Director: Ronald Matthes, Frank Mathel, Patrick von Schuckmann
- Producer: Matthias Mirke, Ronald Matthes, Patrick von Schuckmann

Doro video chronology
| Für Immer (2003) | Classic Diamonds – The DVD (2004) | 20 Years – A Warrior Soul (2006) |

Professional ratings
Review scores
| Source | Rating |
|---|---|
| Metal Hammer (GER) | 5/7 stars |

Classic Diamonds – The DVD is a DVD video album by hard rock singer Doro Pesch, released in 2004 by AFM Records. The DVD contains footage from two concerts held during the European tour which followed the release of the studio album Classic Diamonds. The album was a special project for Doro Pesch, who revised and re-arranged some of her songs for the Classic Night Orchestra, a 30-elements symphonic orchestra. A smaller ensemble of the orchestra accompanied Doro and her usual touring musicians on tour, but the full orchestra was on stage in August 2004 at Wacken Open Air for a strictly acoustic set, an unusual performance for the largest European heavy metal festival. Special guests of the night were former-Iron Maiden singer Blaze Bayley and guitarist Chris Caffery (Savatage, Trans-Siberian Orchestra).

As an extra, the DVD features also a concert held in Cologne, Germany, where Doro performed her usual heavy metal repertoire and which the German TV show Rockpalast broadcast on 17 October 2004.

== Track listing ==
1. Intro

Live in Wacken - ≈ 43:00

1. "Fear of the Dark"
2. "I Rule the Ruins"
3. "Touch of Evil"
4. "Metal Tango"
5. "Für Immer" ('Forever')
6. "Let Love Rain on Me"
7. "Breaking the Law"
8. "All We Are"

Impressions of the tour - ≈ 15:00

1. Documentary of the tour, backstage, interviews

Live In Hamburg - ≈ 61:00

1. "I Rule the Ruins"
2. "Metal Tango"
3. "She's Like Thunder"
4. "Let Love Rain on Me"
5. "Hellraiser"
6. "Touch of Evil"
7. "Fall for Me Again"
8. "Tausend Mal Gelebt" ('Lived a Thousand Times')
9. "Breaking the Law"
10. "Fear of the Dark"
11. "All We Are"
12. "Outro"

Extras - ≈ 63:00

- "Let Love Rain on Me" - making of the do video clip
- "Let Love Rain on Me" - video clip
- Rockpalast TV Show
1. "Metal Tango"
2. "True As Steel"
3. "Für Immer"
4. "Breaking the Law"
5. "Interview"
6. "Let Love Rain on Me"
7. "Tausend Mal Gelebt" ('Lived a Thousand Times')
8. "All We Are"
- Documentary of European Tour
- Discography
- Photo Gallery

== Personnel ==
=== Band members ===
- Doro Pesch - vocals
- Nick Douglas - bass, keyboards, backing vocals
- Joe Taylor - guitars, backing vocals
- Johnny Dee - drums, percussion, backing vocals
- Oliver Palotai - keyboards, guitars, backing vocals

=== Additional musicians ===
- The Classic Night Orchestra
- Blaze Bayley - lead vocals on "Fear of the Dark"
- Chris Caffery - lead guitar on Wacken concert
- Klaus Vanscheidt - guitars

=== Production ===
- Frank Machel - director, editor
- Ronald Matthes - director, executive producer
- Matthias Mirke - executive producer
- Patrick von Schuckmann - director, producer
- Patrick Basedow, Erik Fugmann-Brandt, Alexandra Seifert - editors
- Michael Hankel, Chris Lietz - mixing
- Matthias Wendt - mastering
