= Herzblut =

Herzblut (English: heart and soul) may refer to:

- Herzblut (Doro EP), 2008
- Herzblut (Subway to Sally album), 2001
