= Britny Fox (album) =

Studio album by Britny Fox
- Released: June 6, 1988
- Recorded: January–April 1988
- Studio: The Warehouse Studios, Philadelphia; The House of Music, West Orange, New Jersey
- Genre: Glam metal
- Length: 45:11
- Label: Columbia
- Producer: John Jansen

Britny Fox chronology
In America (1987)	Britny Fox (1988)	Boys in Heat (1989)

Singles from Britny Fox
- 1. "Long Way to Love" Released: 4 July 1988; 2. "Girlschool" Released: 12 October 1988; 3. "Save the Weak" Released: 19 January 1989

Professional ratings
Review scores
Source	Rating
AllMusic	3.5/5 stars
Classic Rock	6/10 stars
Collector's Guide to Heavy Metal	7/10
Kerrang!	5/5 stars
Rock Hard	7.5/10

Britny Fox is the debut album by the American glam metal band Britny Fox, released on June 6, 1988, through Columbia Records. The album contains the hits "Long Way to Love", "Girlschool" and the power ballad "Save the Weak". On December 21, 1988, the album was certified as gold.

== Track listing ==
All credits adapted from the original LP.

All tracks are written by Dean Davidson, except where indicated.

Side one
No.	Title	Writer(s)	Length
1.	"Girlschool"		4:39
2.	"Long Way to Love"		4:54
3.	"Kick 'n' Fight"	Davidson, Tony Destra	3:37
4.	"Save the Weak"		5:30
5.	"Fun in Texas"		4:27

Side two
No.	Title	Writer(s)	Length
6.	"Rock Revolution"		4:40
7.	"Don't Hide"		4:50
8.	"Gudbuy T'Jane" (Slade cover)	Noddy Holder, Jim Lea	4:26
9.	"In America"	Davidson, Destra	4:25
10.	"Hold On"		3:30
Total length:			45:11

American Beat Records reissue bonus tracks
No.	Title	Length
11.	"Long Way to Love" (single version)
12.	"Livin' on the Edge" (B-side)

== Personnel ==
All credits adapted from the original LP.

Band members

- "Dizzy" Dean Davidson – lead vocals, rhythm guitar
- Michael Kelly Smith – lead guitar, background vocals, mixing assistant
- Billy Childs – bass guitar, background vocals
- Johnny Dee – drums, percussion, background vocals

Additional musicians

- David Gibbins – keyboards on "Save the Weak"

Production

- John Jansen – producer, engineer, mixing at Blue Jay Recording Studio, Carlisle, Massachusetts
- Nelson Ayers – engineer
- Chris Brown – assistant engineer
- Michael Frondelli – mixing
- Greg Calbi – mastering at Sterling Sound, New York

== Charts ==
Chart (1988)	Peak position
US Billboard 200	39

== Certifications ==
Region	Certification	Certified units/sales
United States (RIAA)	Gold	500,000^{^}
^{^} Shipments figures based on certification alone.

== Accolades ==
Publication	Country	Accolade	Rank
Rolling Stone	US	50 Greatest Hair Metal Albums of All Time	38
L.A. Weekly	US	Chuck Klosterman's Favorite Hair Metal Albums	20
Metal Rules	US	Top 50 Glam Metal Albums	44
