= Boys in Heat =

Studio album by Britny Fox
- Released: December 17, 1989
- Studios: Platinum Island, New York City; Power Station, New York City; Soundtrack Recording, New York City
- Genres: Glam metal, hard rock
- Length: 51:13
- Label: Columbia
- Producer: Neil Kernon

Britny Fox chronology
Britny Fox (1988)	Boys in Heat (1989)	Bite Down Hard (1991)

Singles from Boys in Heat
- 1. "Standing in the Shadows" Released: 1989; 2. "Dream On" Released: 1990

Professional ratings
Review scores
Source	Rating
AllMusic	3/5 stars
Classic Rock	6/10 stars
Collector's Guide to Heavy Metal	7/10

Boys in Heat is the second album by the American glam metal band Britny Fox, released in 1989. After this album, singer "Dizzy" Dean Davidson left the group and formed the band Blackeyed Susan. He was replaced by singer Tommy Paris. The album debuted at No. 149 on the Billboard 200 albums chart dated November 25, 1989, and peaked at No. 79 the following week, staying there for 3 weeks. The song "Hair of the Dog" was originally recorded by Nazareth on the album Hair of the Dog (1975).

== Track listing ==
All tracks are written by Dean Davidson, except where indicated.

Side one
No.	Title	Writer(s)	Length
1.	"In Motion"		2:46
2.	"Standing in the Shadows"		3:49
3.	"Hair of the Dog" (Nazareth cover)	Dan McCafferty, Pete Agnew, Manny Charlton, Darrell Sweet	4:11
4.	"Livin' on a Dream"		3:20
5.	"She's So Lonely"		4:03
6.	"Dream On"	Davidson, Michael Kelly Smith	4:47
7.	"Long Way from Home"		4:11

Side two
No.	Title	Writer(s)	Length
8.	"Plenty of Love"		4:16
9.	"Stevie"	Davidson, Billy Childs	4:26
10.	"Shine On"		3:32
11.	"Angel in My Heart"		4:20
12.	"Left Me Stray"		3:15
13.	"Longroad"		4:03

== Personnel ==
Band members

- "Dizzy" Dean Davidson - lead vocals, rhythm guitar, lead guitar on track 8, harmonica
- Michael Kelly Smith - lead guitars, backing vocals
- Billy Childs - bass, keyboards, backing vocals
- Johnny Dee - drums, backing vocals, cowbell and tambourine in "Hair of the Dog"

Production

- Neil Kernon - producer, engineer, mixing
- Chris Trevett - engineer, mixing
- Oz Fritz, Paul Berry, Dan Gellert - engineers
- Howie Weinberg - mastering at Masterdisk, New York

== Charts ==
Chart (1989)	Peak position
US Billboard 200	79
