= Classic Diamonds =

Studio album of re-recorded songs by Doro with the Classic Night Orchestra
- Released: 20 September 2004
- Recorded: December 2003 – August 2004
- Studios: Studio 301, Major's Studio, Cologne, Germany
- Genres: Symphonic rock, acoustic rock
- Length: 50:59
- Label: AFM
- Producers: Torsten Sickert, Chris Lietz

Doro chronology
Let Love Rain on Me (2004)	Classic Diamonds (2004)	In Liebe und Freundschaft (2005)

Deluxe edition CD cover

Professional ratings
Review scores
Source	Rating
AllMusic	3.5/5 stars
Metal Hammer (GER)	5/7 stars

Classic Diamonds is the ninth studio album by the German female hard rock singer Doro Pesch. It was released worldwide in 2004 by AFM Records. The album presents new acoustic and symphonic arrangements for songs from Doro's repertoire, as well as some new compositions. The music is mostly played by the Classic Night Orchestra, an ensemble of young classical musicians that accompanied Doro in the following European tour.

== Overview ==
Doro Pesch had already experienced mixing her powerful hard rock vocals with a symphonic orchestra in 2001 in a concert in Düsseldorf and later in 2003 for a benefit concert in Bochum. Excerpts from both shows are contained in the Für Immer DVD. The results of the two shows and the reaction of the fans prompted the German singer to plan a more organic approach to the symphonic facets of her songs, scheduling an album and a tour with an orchestra. The Classic Night Orchestra was recruited looking for young, open-minded, and multi-ethnic classical musicians, reaching the number of 30 elements. With the help of the classically trained band member Oliver Palotai and producer Torsten Sickert, Doro arranged some old and new tracks for the orchestra and recorded them in Cologne. The album took almost eight months to complete and is the most expensive recording produced by Doro.

Besides the eleven songs played with the orchestra, the album contains two tracks recorded live and acoustically in studio by Doro's band and two other tracks played by Torsten Sickert with an emulator tuned to classical instruments.

The album was published at the same time of the European tour, where many elements of the Classic Night Orchestra played together with Doro's usual live band in most venues. At Wacken Open Air festival on 6 August 2004, the full Classic Night Orchestra was on stage for the show. Various shows of the Classic Diamonds tour were filmed and later released on Classic Diamonds – The DVD.

The album was published in various formats by AFM Records, with and without bonus tracks and even as a deluxe 2-CD set, together with the Let Love Rain on Me EP.

"Breaking the Law" is a cover of the Judas Priest song, recorded on their 1980 album British Steel.

The album peaked at position No. 33 in the German Longplay chart.

== Track listing ==
No.	Title	Writer(s)	Length
1.	"I Rule the Ruins"	Doro Pesch, Joey Balin	4:02
2.	"Metal Tango"	Pesch, Balin	3:57
3.	"Breaking the Law"	K. K. Downing, Rob Halford, Glenn Tipton	4:22
4.	"All We Are"	Pesch, Balin	2:56
5.	"Für Immer" ("Forever")	Pesch, Balin	4:36
6.	"Let Love Rain on Me"	Pesch, Gary Scruggs	3:52
7.	"Burn It Up"	Pesch, Jürgen Engler, Chris Lietz	2:25
8.	"Tausend Mal Gelebt" ("Lived a Thousand Times")	Pesch, Scruggs	4:17
9.	"I'm in Love with You"	Pesch, Reinhold Mack	4:44
10.	"Always Live to Win" (Bonus track)	Pesch, Lietz	3:00
11.	"Undying"	Pesch, Scruggs	3:39
12.	"Love Me in Black"	Pesch, Jimmy Harry	5:18
13.	"She's Like Thunder" (Bonus track)	Pesch, Nick Douglas, Lietz	3:51
Total length:			50:59

Limited edition bonus tracks
No.	Title	Writer(s)	Length
14.	"The Last Goodbye"	Douglas, Savalas	3:10
15.	"The Final"	Torsten Sickert, Oliver Palotai	1:21

- Limited edition also has "Let Love Rain on Me" music video.

== Personnel ==
- Doro Pesch – vocals

=== The Classic Night Orchestra ===
- Arnt Böhme – conductor, orchestral arrangements on tracks 1, 2, 5
- Hye-sin Tjo, Ardan Saguner, Nonna Parfenov, Elda Teqja, Marco Stankovic, Ingrid Illguth – first violins
- Carolin Kosa, Arhan Saguner, Emma Fridman, Jee-eun Lee, Alexander Schneider – second violins
- Wiebke Corssen, Urs Beckers, Ernst Hesse, Kristina Iczque, Manuela Crespi – violas
- Lev Gordin, Martin Henneken, Jens Peter Jandausch, Luise Schroeter – violoncellos
- Milivoj Plavsic – contrabass
- Daniel Edelhoff, Jörg Brohm – trumpets
- Wolfgang Mundt, Carsten Gronwald – second trumpets
- Andreas Roth, Peter Schatlo – trombones
- Jan Böhme – bass trombone
- Klaus 'Major' Heuser – acoustic guitars
- Wolf Simon – drums
- Mario Arrangonda – percussion

=== Additional musicians ===
- Johnny Dee – drums on tracks 10 and 14
- Udo Dirkschneider – lead vocals on track 3
- Nick Douglas – bass on tracks 10 and 14
- Claus Fischer– bass on track 4
- Kai Hansen – guitars and bass on track 13, acoustic guitars, backing vocals
- Oliver Palotai – piano, orchestral arrangements on tracks 6, 7, 12, 15
- Dirk Schoppen – bass on track 4, backing vocals
- Joe Taylor – acoustic guitar on tracks 10 and 14
- Martin Wagemann – solo trumpet
- Oliver Best, Thomas Nathan, Klaus Vanscheidt – backing vocals

=== Production ===
- Torsten Sickert – producer, Midnight Orchestra on tracks 9 and 13, orchestral arrangements on tracks 3, 4, 8, 9, 11, 13, 15
- Chris Lietz – producer
- Mika Jussila – mastering
- Wieland Reißmann – engineer, orchestral arrangements on track 9
- Thorsten Rentsch – engineer, mixing

== Charts ==
Chart (2004)	Peak position
German Albums (Offizielle Top 100)	33
