= Springhead Motorshark =

Studio album by Britny Fox
- Released: July 29, 2003
- Genre: Hard rock, glam metal
- Length: 43:40
- Label: Spitfire
- Producer: Tommy Paris, Michael Kelly Smith

Britny Fox chronology
Bite Down Hard (1991)	Springhead Motorshark (2003)

Professional ratings
Review scores
Source	Rating
AllMusic	2.5/5 stars

Springhead Motorshark is the fourth studio album by American glam metal band Britny Fox, released on July 29, 2003, by Spitfire Records.

== Track list ==
No.	Title	Writer(s)	Length
1.	"Pain"	Michael Kelly Smith, Tommy Paris	2:53
2.	"Freaktown"	Smith, Paris	2:52
3.	"T.L.U.C.(For You)"	Smith, Paris	3:38
4.	"L A"	Paris	4:17
5.	"Springhead Motorshark" (instrumental)	Smith, Paris	2:51
6.	"Is It Real?"	Smith	4:00
7.	"Coup D'etat" (instrumental)	Smith	0:40
8.	"Far Enough"	Billy Childs, Paris	4:40
9.	"Lonely Ones"	Paris	4:27
10.	"Memorial"	Childs, Paris	4:11
11.	"Sri Lanka"	Childs, Paris	9:11

== Personnel ==
Band members

- Tommy Paris - lead and backing vocals, guitar, keyboards, producer, mixing
- Michael Kelly Smith - lead and rhythm guitars, bass, mandolin, percussion, lead and backing vocals, producer, engineer, mixing
- Billy Childs - bass, rhythm guitar, backing vocals
- Johnny Dee - drums

Production

- Peter Humphreys - mastering
