= 25 Years in Rock... and Still Going Strong =

- cover art by Geoffrey Gillespie

Video by Doro
- Released: 26 November 2010
- Recorded: 13 December 2008
- Venues: ISS Dome, Düsseldorf, Germany
- Genre: Heavy metal
- Length: 155:11 (DVD 1)
- Label: Nuclear Blast
- Directors: Kaja Kargus, Ronald Matthes
- Producer: Ronald Matthes

Doro video chronology
20 Years – A Warrior Soul (2006)	25 Years in Rock... and Still Going Strong (2010)	Strong and Proud (2016)

25 Years in Rock... and Still Going Strong

Live album by Doro
- Released: 26 November 2010
- Recorded: 13 December 2008
- Venues: ISS Dome, Düsseldorf, Germany
- Genre: Heavy metal
- Length: 39:44
- Label: Nuclear Blast
- Producer: Ronald Matthes

Doro chronology
Fear No Evil (2009)	25 Years in Rock... and Still Going Strong (2010)	Under My Skin: A Fine Selection of Doro Classics (2012)

Professional ratings
Review scores
Source	Rating
Classic Rock	8/10 stars
Metal Hammer (GER)	6/7 stars

25 Years in Rock... and Still Going Strong is a boxed set of two DVDs and a CD by the German hard rock singer Doro Pesch, released in 2010 through Nuclear Blast Records.

The first DVD contains the full video of a concert held by Doro in Düsseldorf, Germany, on 13 December 2008, featuring many guests and friends and celebrating 25 years of the German singer's career. The second DVD features a long documentary with the making of the concert and bonus footage of other Doro tours and shows.

== Track listing ==
=== DVD 1 ===
25 Years in Rock - The Concert

1. "Intro 25 Years" - 4:50
2. "Earthshaker Rock" - 4:05
3. "I Rule the Ruins" - 5:49
4. "You're My Family" - 4:47
5. "The Night of the Warlock" - 6:41
6. "Hellraiser" - 5:32
7. "Always Live to Win" (feat. Bobby "Blitz" Ellsworth) - 4:02
8. "Above the Ashes" - 4:59
9. "She's Like Thunder" - 3:52
10. "Herzblut" ('Passion') - 5:01
11. "Für Immer" ('Forever') - 7:19
12. "Burn It Up" (feat. Jean Beauvoir) - 3:52
13. "Metal Tango" - 4:09
14. "Drum Solo by Johnny Dee" - 9:54
15. "Celebrate" (Full Metal Female Version) (feat. Sabina Classen, Floor Jansen, Liv Kristine, Ji-In Cho, Liv Jagrell, Jackie Chambers, Enid Williams) - 7:03
16. "Love Me In Black" - 6:39
17. "Walking with the Angels" (feat. Tarja Turunen) - 5:55
18. "East Meets West" (feat. Chris Boltendahl, Axel Rudi Pell) - 5:16
19. "Breaking the Law" - 4:40
20. "Big City Nights" (feat. Klaus Meine, Rudolf Schenker) - 6:15
21. "Rock You Like a Hurricane" (feat. Klaus Meine, Rudolf Schenker) - 6:31
22. "Fight for Rock" (Warlock line-up 1986) - 3:22
23. "Burning the Witches" (Warlock line-up 1986) - 7:15
24. "True as Steel" (Warlock line-up 1986, feat. Warrel Dane) - 5:24
25. "Unholy Love" (feat. Honza K.Behunek) - 4:41
26. "Fight" - 4:43
27. "All We Are" (feat. all the guests of this special night and a lot of good friends) - 9:42
28. "Outro" - 2:53

=== DVD 2 ===
25 Years in Rock - The Documentary

- Intro
- From Concept to Creation
- Soundcheck
- Ready to Go
1. "Earthshaker Rock"
2. "I Rule the Ruins"
3. "You're My Family"
- Making of the Warlock
4. "The Night of the Warlock"
5. "Always Live to WIn"
6. "Above the Ashes"
7. "She's Like Thunder"
8. "Herzblut"
9. "Für Immer" ('Forever')
10. "Burn It Up"
11. "Celebrate" (Full Metal Female Version)
12. "Love Me In Black"
13. "Walking with the Angels"
14. "East Meets West"
15. "Big City Nights"
16. "Rock You Like a Hurricane
17. "Fight for Rock"
18. "True as Steel"
19. "Hellbound"
20. "Unholy Love"
- Fans International
21. "All We Are / Grand Finale"
- The Show Is Over
- After the Show
- Outro

Extra features, highlights & bonus goodies

- 2500th Concert Special (feat. extracts of "I Rule the Ruins", "Danke", "Burning the Witches" (with Andy Brings), "Burn Bitch Burn", "We Are the Metalheads" (with Schmier), "On My Own" (with Luke Gasser and Marc Storace), "You're My Family", "Unholy Love")
- China Special
- Wacken Open Air 2009
1. "I Rule the Ruins"
2. "Burning the Witches"
3. "Burn It Up"
- Bang Your Head 2010
1. "Egypt (The Chains Are On)"
2. "Running with the Devil"
- Summer Breeze 2007
1. "You're My Family" (feat. Chris Caffery)
- Metal Female Voices Fest 2009
1. "True as Steel"
2. "Hellbound"
3. "We Are the Metalheads"
- TV Special : 2500th Concert
- A Tattoo from Doro at Germany Ink

=== Bonus CD ===
Special tracks from the 25th Anniversary Show

1. "Introduction" - 0:19
2. "Earthshaker Rock" - 4:06
3. "I Rule the Ruins" - 4:01
4. "You're My Family" - 4:28
5. "Herzblut" ('Passion') - 4:33
6. "Unholy Love" (feat. Honza Behunek) - 4:12
7. "East Meets West" (feat. Chris Boltendahl) - 4:17
8. "Burn It Up" (feat. Jean Beauvoir) - 3:07
9. "Above the Ashes" - 4:16
10. "Celebrate" (feat. Sabina Classen, Floor Jansen, Ji-In Cho, Liv Kristine, Liv Jagrell, Jackie Chambers, Enid Williams) - 4:52
11. "Breaking the Law" - 4:40

== Personnel ==
=== Band members ===
- Doro Pesch - vocals
- Joe Taylor - guitars, backing vocals
- Oliver Palotai - keyboards, guitars, backing vocals
- Nick Douglas - bass, keyboards, backing vocals
- Johnny Dee - drums, backing vocals

=== Warlock 1986 members ===
- Doro Pesch - vocals
- Peter Szigeti - guitars
- Niko Arvanitis - guitars
- Nick Douglas - bass, backing vocals
- Michael Eurich - drums

== Charts ==
Chart (2010)	Peak position
German Albums (Offizielle Top 100)	61
