= Bite Down Hard =

Studio album by Britny Fox
- Released: October 29, 1991
- Recorded: September 1991
- Studios: One on One and Devonshire Sound, North Hollywood, California
- Genres: Rock; glam metal
- Length: 41:10
- Label: East West
- Producers: John Purdell, Duane Baron

Britny Fox chronology
| Boys in Heat (1989) | Bite Down Hard (1991) | Springhead Motorshark (2003) |

Singles from Bite Down Hard
- 1. "Louder" Released: 1991; 2. "Over and Out" Released: 1991

Bite Down Hard is the third studio album by American glam metal band Britny Fox, released on October 29, 1991, through East West Records.

It is the first album to feature singer/rhythm guitarist Tommy Paris. It also features guest appearances by Zakk Wylde (track 1) and Poison drummer Rikki Rockett (track 10).

== Critical reception ==
Professional ratings
Review scores
| Source | Rating |
|---|---|
| AllMusic | 2/5 stars |
| Chicago Tribune | 3/4 stars |
| Collector's Guide to Heavy Metal | 7/10 |

The Chicago Tribune deemed the songs "fast, seamless bits of Sunset Strip rock." The Washington Post wrote that, "the usual sexism aside, this is serviceable pop-metal."

== Track listing ==
All songs by Tommy Paris and Billy Childs except where noted.

1. "Six Guns Loaded" (Paris, Michael Kelly Smith) - 3:46
2. "Louder" - 3:53
3. "Liar" - 4:42
4. "Closer to Your Love" - 3:48
5. "Over and Out" - 4:45
6. "Shot from My Gun" (Paris, Smith) - 4:07
7. "Black and White" (Paris, Smith, Childs, Johnny Dee) - 3:35
8. "Look My Way" - 4:32
9. "Lonely Too Long" (Paris, Smith) - 3:34
10. "Midnight Moses" (Alex Harvey) - 4:28 (The Sensational Alex Harvey Band cover)

== Credits ==
Band members

- Tommy Paris - lead vocals, guitar, guitar solos on tracks 7 and 9
- Michael Kelly Smith - lead guitar, vocals
- Billy Childs - bass, acoustic guitar on tracks 3 and 5, vocals
- Johnny Dee - drums

Additional musicians

- Zakk Wylde - guitar solo at end of track 1
- Rikki Rockett - percussion break on track 10

Production

- John Purdell, Duane Baron - producers, engineers, mixing
- Sean Odwyer, Ulrich Wild - assistant engineers
- Howie Weinberg - mastering at Masterdisk, New York
- Bob Defrin - art direction
- John Scarpati - photography
- Brittney Powell - cover model
