= Raise Your Fist =

- Cover art by Geoffrey Gillespie

Studio album by Doro
- Released: 19 October 2012
- Recorded: Eardrum Studios, Hamburg, Studio 102, Bochum, Mastersound Studios, Steinheim, Germany; Intermedia Post, New Jersey, USA
- Genre: Heavy metal
- Length: 52:01
- Label: Nuclear Blast
- Producers: Andreas Bruhn, Doro Pesch, Torsten Sickert

Doro chronology
Raise Your Fist in the Air (2012)	Raise Your Fist (2012)	Forever Warriors, Forever United (2018)

Professional ratings
Review scores
Source	Rating
AllMusic	3.5/5 stars
Blistering	7/10 stars
Metal Forces	(6/10)
Revolver	3.5/5 stars

Raise Your Fist is the twelfth studio album by the German female heavy metal singer Doro, released on 19 October 2012 and 6 November 2012 in USA through Nuclear Blast Records. The song "Hero" is dedicated to the late Ronnie James Dio.

On 5 May 2014, Nuclear Blast issued a special edition of the album to celebrate the 30th anniversary of Doro's first live show, which included a second CD titled Powerful Passionate Favorites containing remixes, covers and a demo. It was published in coincide with the German singer's two special celebratory concerts held at CCD Stadthalle of her hometown Düsseldorf.

== Track listing ==
No.	Title	Writer(s)	Length
1.	"Raise Your Fist in the Air"	Andreas Bruhn, Doro Pesch	3:47
2.	"Coldhearted Lover"	Wolfgang Michels, Pesch	3:35
3.	"Rock Till Death"	Filip Sembera, Lucie Roubickova, Pesch	3:02
4.	"It Still Hurts" (ft. Lemmy Kilmister)	Bruhn, Pesch	4:09
5.	"Take No Prisoner"	Dennis Krüger, Pesch	3:08
6.	"Grab the Bull (Last Man Standing)" (ft. Gus G.)	Bruhn, Pesch	4:57
7.	"Engel" ("Angel")	Bruhn, Pesch	5:13
8.	"Freiheit ('Freedom') (Human Rights)"	Bruhn, Pesch	3:44
9.	"Little Headbanger (Nackenbrecher)" ("Neckbreaker")	Bruhn, Pesch	3:14
10.	"Revenge"	Bas Maas, Pesch	4:48
11.	"Free My Heart"	Bruhn, Pesch	5:09
12.	"Victory"	Kendal Stubbs, Roderick Colebrook	3:11
13.	"Hero"	Pesch, Joey Balin	4:04

Digipak edition bonus tracks
No.	Title	Writer(s)	Length
14.	"Sealed in Blood (Human Rights)"	Bruhn, Pesch	3:44
15.	"Strong and Proud"	Nick Douglas, Pesch	3:33

Powerful Passionate Favorites – 30 Years Anniversary Edition bonus disc
No.	Title	Writer(s)	Originally performed by	Length
1.	"It Still Hurts" (new mix, featuring Lemmy)	Bruhn, Pesch	Doro Pesch	4:27
2.	"Léve Ton Poing Vers Le Ciel" ("Raise Your Fist in the Air")	Andreas Bruhn, Doro Pesch	Doro Pesch	3:55
3.	"Babe I'm Gonna Leave You"	Anne Bredon, Jimmy Page, Robert Plant	Led Zeppelin	7:08
4.	"Nutbush City Limits"	Tina Turner	Ike & Tina Turner	2:41
5.	"Only You"	Gene Simmons	Kiss	4:20
6.	"Egypt (The Chains Are On)"	Vinny Appice, Jimmy Bain, Vivian Campbell, Ronnie James Dio	Dio	6:10
7.	"Nothing Else Matters"	James Hetfield, Lars Ulrich	Metallica	5:59
8.	"Warfare" (from the soundtrack of the movie Anouk III – Die Dunkle Flut)	Luke Gasser		3:48
9.	"NYC Blues" (demo, previously unreleased)	Pesch		5:05
Total length:				43:33

== Personnel ==
;Band members
- Doro Pesch – vocals
- Bas Maas – guitars
- Luca Princiotta – guitars, keyboards
- Nick Douglas – bass
- Johnny Dee – drums

Additional musicians

- Thorsten Bauer – guitar, bass, backing vocals
- Felix Born – drums
- Uwe Fichtner – backing vocals
- Gus G. – guitar solo on track 6
- Mike "Metal" Goldberg – drums
- Lemmy Kilmister – vocals on track 4
- Alexander Krull – backing vocals
- Lucie Roubickova – backing vocals on tracks 3 and 6
- Filip Sembera – guitar on track 3
- Torsten Sickert – guitars, bass and drums on track 3, keyboards
- Klaus Vanscheidt – guitars and backing vocals on track 3
- Harrison Young – keyboards

Production

- Thorsten Bauer – engineer on track 6
- Andreas Bruhn – producer, engineer and mixing on tracks 2, 5, 7, 8, 9, 11, 14, engineer on tracks 1, 6 and 10, mixing on track 15
- Jens Dreesen – mastering
- Mike Goldberg – engineer on tracks 12, 13
- Jacob Hansen – mixing on tracks 1, 3, 4, 5, 9, 10
- Rudy Kronenberger – mixing on track 13
- Alexander Krull – engineer, mixing and mastering on track 6
- Jochen Kux – engineer and mixing on tracks 2, 5, 7, 8, 9, 11, 14, engineer on tracks 1 and 6, mixing on track 15
- Bas Maas – engineer
- Doro Pesch – producer
- Chris Rakestraw – vocal engineer
- Torsten Sickert – arranger, producer and engineer on track 3
- Kendal Stubbs – programming on track 12
- Afshin Tahmasebi – engineer on tracks 10 and 15

== Charts ==
Chart (2012)	Peak position
Belgian Albums (Ultratop Wallonia)	116
Austrian Albums (Ö3 Austria)	50
French Albums (SNEP)	177
German Albums (Offizielle Top 100)	16
Swedish Albums (Sverigetopplistan)	29
Swiss Albums (Schweizer Hitparade)	52
UK Rock & Metal Albums (Official Charts)	32
