= Love Me in Black (EP) =

EP by Doro
- Released: 1998
- Recorded: Avatar (New York, New York); Atom H Studios (Düsseldorf, Germany)
- Genres: Hard rock, heavy metal
- Length: 21:15
- Label: WEA
- Producers: Jimmy Harry, Fred Maher, Jürgen Engler, Chris Lietz

Doro chronology
Machine II Machine: Electric Club Mixes (1995)	Love Me in Black (1998)	Love Me in Black (1998)

Love Me in Black is an EP by German hard rock singer Doro Pesch, released in Germany in 1998 by the WEA label. It was the first release by Doro with her new label, after her split with Vertigo, and preceded of a few weeks the eponymous album.

== Track listing ==
All tracks are written by Jimmy Harry and Doro Pesch.

No.	Title	Length
1.	"Love Me in Black" (Radio edit)	3:59
2.	"Love Me in Black" (Electric radio edit)	3:59
3.	"Love Me in Black"	4:48
4.	"Terrorvision" (Desert Storm mix)	3:41
5.	"Kiss of Fire"	4:58
Total length:		21:15

== Personnel ==
- Doro Pesch – vocals
- Jimmy Harry – guitars, bass, keyboards, programming, drum programming, producer, mixing, engineer
- Fred Maher – programming, producer, engineer
- Damon Weber – drums
- Nick Douglas, Andrew Goodsight – bass
