= Für Immer (video) =

Video by Doro
- Released: 1 December 2003
- Recorded: The Cave, Balve, Germany; 2002
- Genre: Heavy metal
- Length: 330:00
- Label: SPV/Steamhammer
- Director: Roger Bisson, Steve Ravic
- Producer: Patrick von Schuckmann, Wolfgang Füller, Bernhard Boran, René Weljens

Doro video chronology
Doro Live '93 (1993)	Für Immer (2003)	Classic Diamonds – The DVD (2004)

Professional ratings
Review scores
Source	Rating
Allmusic	4/5 stars

Für Immer is a double DVD video album by hard rock singer Doro Pesch, released in 2003 by SPV/Steamhammer. The first DVD contains the full concert given at The Cave in Balve, Germany, during the Fight tour in 2002 and a collection of all Doro's videos. The second DVD, instead, contains three documentaries and live footage taken in various places and moments of Doro's career, including her first experience with a symphonic orchestra.

The DVD was certified Gold in Germany, having sold more than 25,000 copies.

== Track listing ==
=== DVD 1 ===
The Cave Concert

1. "Intro" - 0:44
2. "Hellbound" - 3:10
3. "Always Live to Win" - 3:39
4. "True as Steel" - 3:34
5. "I Rule the Ruins" - 4:55
6. "Burning the Witches" - 4:40
7. "Save My Soul" - 4:01
8. "Hellraiser" - 5:17
9. "Love Me in Black" - 5:03
10. "Für Immer" ('Forever') - 6:55
11. "Fall for Me Again" - 4:31
12. "East Meets West" - 3:48
13. "Burn It Up" - 3:13
14. "Fight" - 3:43
15. "All We Are" - 7:31
16. "Rock Before We Bleed" - 4:10
17. "Earthshaker Rock" - 4:31
18. "Undying" - 3:28
19. "Constant Danger" - 4:08
20. "Chained" - 3:55
21. "Ich Will Alles" ('I Want Everything') - 2:16
22. "Metal Tango" - 5:50

The Video Collection

1. "Fight for Rock" - 3:28
2. "All We Are" - 3:58
3. "Für Immer" ('Forever') - 4:05
4. "Unholy Love" - 4:02
5. "Bad Blood" - 3:51
6. "Ceremony" - 3:43
7. "Love Me in Black" - 4:00
8. "White Wedding" - 4:02
9. "Always Live to Win" - 3:04
10. "Fight" - 4:11
11. "Chained" - 4:17

=== DVD 2 ===
Documentary

1. Doro - Rock'U'mentary
2. Doro DownUnder - Australia 2003
3. True Fans - René's Room

Access All Areas - part 1

1. "Born to Be Wild", Derby, UK 2002
2. Soundcheck, Hamburg, Große Freiheit 36, 2001
3. "White Wedding", Hamburg, Große Freiheit 36, 2001
4. "Man on the Silver Mountain", Valencia, Spain (with Mägo de Oz)
5. "Born to Raise Hell", London, UK (with Motörhead)
6. "I Rule the Ruins", Bang Your Head!!! Festival, Balingen, 2002
7. "Hellbound", Wacken Open Air, Bootleg 2002
8. "All We Are", Barcelona, Spain, Palau Olympic, 2002
9. "All We Are", Bremen, Aladin, 2001 (with Jean Beauvoir)
10. "Hellbound", Rijeka, Croatia, Fight Tour 2002
11. "Tausend Mal Gelebt", Frankfurt, 1998 (In memory to Mario Parillo)
12. "Whenever I Think of You", Hamburg, Große Freiheit 36, 1993
13. Dressed to Kill, Los Angeles, 1990
14. "Earthshaker Rock" & Interview, UK 1986
15. "Time to Die", Bochum, Zeche, 03.06.1985 (Doro's Birthday!)
16. Tschüss, Bye Bye

Doro Meets Symphony

1. "Live It", Düsseldorf, Tonhalle
2. "Danke", Düsseldorf, Tonhalle
3. "Burn It Up", Düsseldorf, Tonhalle
4. "White Wedding", Bochum, Zeche
5. "I Rule the Ruins", Bochum, Zeche

Access All Areas - part 2

1. "Undying", Star FM Radio
2. "Hellraiser", Wacken Open Air 2002
3. "Bad Blood", Wacken Open Air 2002
4. "Burning the Witches", Bang Your Head!!! Festival 2002
5. "Egypt", Earth Shaker Festival 2002
6. "Save My Soul", Große Freiheit 2002
7. "Beyond the Trees", Große Freiheit 2002
8. "Salvaje" ('Wild'), studio recording

== Personnel ==
=== Band members ===
- Doro Pesch - vocals
- Nick Douglas - bass, keyboards, backing vocals
- Joe Taylor - guitars, backing vocals
- Johnny Dee - drums, backing vocals
- Oliver Palotai - keyboards, guitars, backing vocals

== Certifications ==
Region	Certification	Certified units/sales
Germany (BVMI)	Gold	25,000^{^}
^{^} Shipments figures based on certification alone.
