= Fear No Evil (Doro album) =

Studio album by Doro
- Released: 23 January 2009
- Recorded: Eardrum Studios, Hamburg; W:A:T Factory, Bochum; Crownhyll Studio, Remscheid, Germany; Soundmine Recording Studios, Stroudsburg, Pennsylvania, USA
- Genre: Heavy metal
- Length: 47:44
- Label: AFM
- Producers: Andreas Bruhn, Torsten Sickert, Doro Pesch

Doro chronology
Herzblut (2008)	Fear No Evil (2009)	25 Years in Rock... and Still Going Strong (2010)

Ultimate Collector's Edition cover

Professional ratings
Review scores
Source	Rating
Metal Hammer (GER)	6/7 stars 3/7 stars

Fear No Evil is the eleventh studio album of the German female hard rock singer Doro. It was released worldwide in 2009 by AFM Records. The album was produced and engineered by usual collaborators Andreas Bruhn, Chris Lietz and Torsten Sickert and reflects in the songs a strong celebrative mood. In fact, titles like "Night of the Warlock", "Celebrate", "25 Years" and the new collaboration with the American Joey Balin, who had produced the last Warlock album, were meant to celebrate the 25th anniversary of the first LP released by Doro Pesch, Burning the Witches in 1984. On 13 December 2008, a big celebrative concert with dozens of guests was held in Doro's native city of Düsseldorf, featuring also some of the musicians who had participated in the making of this album;Tarja Turunen (former singer of Nightwish) performed a duet with Doro on "Walking with the Angels", Saxon singer Biff Byford sang on the single "Celebrate" with many female metal singers that Doro had befriended during her many tours and festival attendances.

The album was re-released in 2010 in an Ultimate Collector's Edition triple CD issue, comprising the EPs Celebrate – The Night of the Warlock and Herzblut.

Fear No Evil reached position No. 11 on the German Longplay chart.

== Track listing ==
No.	Title	Writer(s)	Length
1.	"The Night of the Warlock"	Doro Pesch, Chris Lietz	5:43
2.	"Running from the Devil"	Pesch, Andreas Bruhn	3:36
3.	"Celebrate"	Pesch, Joey Balin	4:54
4.	"Caught in a Battle"	Pesch, Bruhn	3:09
5.	"Herzblut" ("Passion")	Pesch, Bruhn	4:39
6.	"On the Run"	Pesch, Lietz	4:41
7.	"Walking with the Angels"	Pesch, Balin	4:54
8.	"I Lay My Head upon My Sword"	Pesch	3:36
9.	"It Kills Me"	Pesch, Bruhn	4:28
10.	"Long Lost for Love"	Pesch, Joe Taylor	3:26
11.	"25 Years"	Pesch, Bruhn	4:47
Total length:			47:44

Limited edition bonus tracks
No.	Title	Writer(s)	Length
12.	"Wildfire"	Pesch, Bruhn	4:15
13.	"You Won My Love"	Pesch, Nick Douglas	4:13

Ultimate edition bonus tracks
No.	Title	Writer(s)	Length
12.	"All We Are (2007)"	Pesch, Bruhn	3:04
13.	"On My Own"	Pesch, Nick Douglas	3:41

- Limited edition has "Herzblut" music video.

== Personnel ==
=== Band members ===
- Doro Pesch – vocals
- Nick Douglas – bass
- Joe Taylor – guitars
- Johnny Dee – drums
- Oliver Palotai – keyboards, guitars
- Luca Princiotta – keyboards, guitars

=== Additional musicians ===
- Ingulf Brammer – backing vocals
- Andreas Bruhn – guitars, bass
- Lukas Dylong – backing vocals
- Dennis Krueger – guitar
- Chris Lietz – guitar, keyboards
- Dirk Schoppen – backing vocals
- Torsten Sickert – keyboards, guitars, bass
- Tarja Turunen – vocals on "Walking with the Angels"
- Klaus Vanscheidt – guitar, backing vocals

=== Production ===
- Kai Blankenberg – mastering
- Andreas Bruhn – producer, engineer, mixing
- Jarred Cannon – engineer
- Rudy Kronenberger – engineer
- Chris Lietz – engineer, mixing, mastering
- Dan Malsch – engineer
- Doro Pesch – producer
- Torsten Sickert – programming, producer, engineer, mixing

== Charts ==
Chart (2009)	Peak position
Austrian Albums (Ö3 Austria)	51
German Albums (Offizielle Top 100)	11
Swiss Albums (Schweizer Hitparade)	56
