= Calling the Wild =

Studio album by Doro
- Released: 11 September 2000 (Germany); 12 September 2000 (USA)
- Studios: 3:20 Studios, New York City, USA; Atom H Studios, Düsseldorf, Germany; Office Studios, Los Angeles, USA; Intermediapost, New Jersey, USA; Crownhyll Studio, Remscheid, Germany; Egopark, Hamburg, Germany
- Genres: Hard rock, heavy metal
- Length: 62:48; 54:31 (US version)
- Labels: SPV/Steamhammer (Germany), Koch (USA)
- Producers: Jimmy Harry, Jürgen Engler, Chris Lietz, Doro Pesch, Lemmy, Bob Kulick, Bruce Bouillet, Andreas Bruhn, Mike Goldberg, Nelson Ayres, Rudy Kronenberger

Doro chronology
Love Me in Black (1998)	Calling the Wild (2000)	Fight (2002)

US edition CD cover

Singles from Calling the Wild
- 1. "Burn It Up (mixes) / US National Anthem" Released: 2 May 2000; 2. "Ich Will Alles / Give Me a Reason / Rip Me Apart" Released: 17 August 2000; 3. "White Wedding (mixes) / I Adore You" Released: 23 February 2001

Professional ratings
Review scores
Source	Rating
AllMusic	3/5 stars
Metal Hammer (GER)	4/7 stars

Calling the Wild is the seventh solo album by German hard rock singer Doro Pesch. It was released in 2000, in two different editions for the European market and the American one. For this release, Doro changed labels again, having signed contracts with SPV/Steamhammer for Germany and with Koch Records for the USA. Calling the Wild was the first album published in the US after the eponymous one in 1990. The US edition contains also remixed tracks taken from the previous Doro album Love Me in Black. "Love Me Forever" is a cover of Motörhead's song from the album 1916 of 1991. "White Wedding" is a cover of Billy Idol's hit single of 1982 .

== Overview ==
After unsatisfying promotion and distribution of Love Me in Black by WEA, Doro signed in 2000 with German label SPV/Steamhammer. With the aide of her American fan club that had her demos circulating in the offices of various labels, she received an offer for an American release of her new album by Koch Records. She signed this second contract and decided to release two different editions of the album: the first one for the European market, with only unpublished songs; the second one for the American market, which included some songs from Love Me in Black.

Calling the Wild had a production process even more fragmented than the previous album and for the first time Doro herself took the job of producer. Producers and composers Jürgen Engler, Chris Lietz and Jimmy Harry, who had produced Love Me in Black, contributed again some new songs and remixed some old ones for the US edition. Motörhead singer Lemmy Kilmister contributed two songs that were independently produced in Los Angeles, and so did former The Sisters of Mercy guitarist Andreas Bruhn in Germany. The Gary Scruggs' songs and the contributions by the guest musicians required even more independent production.

The music of Calling the Wild trades the industrial and electronic sounds present in Love Me in Black for straight heavy metal, filling the tracks with riffs and guitar solos galore. The remixed songs from the previous album had the drum machine parts replaced by live tracks by German drummer Thomas Franke, with guitar solos provided by former Detente guitarist Mario Parillo and by Jürgen Engler himself. Other guitar solos came from Savatage guitarist Al Pitrelli and Guns N' Roses guitarist Slash. Of the latter, Doro said: "He was mixing his record in New York… The guys in my band and my engineer were laying down basic tracks and they met Slash hanging out backstage at a Type O Negative gig. Slash said he had two more days in the studio and my engineer asked him if he fancied playing the solo. He thought it was a great idea and, the next day, he came into the studio. I telephoned in – I was still in Germany… I was fucking blown away."

Following the release of the album, Doro went on a successful US tour supporting Dio, her first in America in more than ten years.

The album was re-released by SPV/Steamhammer on 25 January 2010 as a digipak 2 CD edition. The track listing includes all the songs of the European edition, all the bonus tracks and b-sides of the singles extracted from the album. The extensive booklet includes new photos and liner notes by Doro Pesch and Nick Douglas.

Calling the Wild peaked at position No. 16 in the German Longplay chart.

== Track listing ==
European edition
No.	Title	Writer(s)	Length
1.	"Kiss Me Like a Cobra"	Jürgen Engler, Doro Pesch, Chris Lietz	3:18
2.	"Dedication (I Give My Blood)"	Engler, Pesch, Lietz	3:54
3.	"Burn It Up"	Engler, Pesch, Lietz	2:45
4.	"Give Me a Reason"	Andreas Bruhn, Pesch	4:19
5.	"Who You Love"	Pesch, Gary Scruggs	3:51
6.	"Scarred"	Jimmy Harry, Pesch	4:39
7.	"Ich Will Alles" ("I Want Everything")	Pesch	2:26
8.	"White Wedding"	William Broad, Steve Stevens	4:37
9.	"I Wanna Live"	Harry, Pesch	2:42
10.	"Love Me Forever"	Ian Kilmister, Michael Burston, Phil Campbell, Phil Taylor	5:15
11.	"Fuel"	Bruhn, Pesch	3:50
12.	"Constant Danger"	Pesch, Scruggs	3:39
13.	"Black Rose"	Pesch, Scruggs	3:43
14.	"Now or Never (Hope in the Darkest Hour)"	Bruhn, Pesch	3:51
15.	"Danke"	Pesch, Henri Staroste	2:57
16.	"Alone Again" (Limited edition bonus track)	Kilmister	4:20
17.	"I Want More" (Limited edition bonus track)	Pesch	2:26
Total length:			62:48

US edition
No.	Title	Writer(s)	Length
1.	"Terrorvision"	Harry, Pesch	2:41
2.	"I Give My Blood (Dedication)"	Engler, Pesch, Lietz	3:54
3.	"White Wedding"	Broad, Stevens	4:38
4.	"I Wanna Live"	Harry, Pesch	2:42
5.	"Kiss Me Like a Cobra"	Engler, Pesch, Lietz	3:24
6.	"Love Me Forever"	Kilmister, Burston, Campbell, Taylor	5:18
7.	"Pain"	Engler, Pesch, Lietz	4:10
8.	"Give Me a Reason"	Bruhn, Pesch	4:21
9.	"Fuel"	Bruhn, Pesch	3:42
10.	"Scarred"	Harry, Pesch	3:52
11.	"Now or Never"	Bruhn, Pesch	4:40
12.	"Alone Again"	Kilmister	3:53
13.	"Constant Danger"	Pesch, Scruggs	4:22
14.	"Burn It Up"	Engler, Pesch, Lietz	2:54
Total length:			54:31

Bonus CD (Re-Issue Digipack Edition 2010)
No.	Title	Length
1.	"Alone Again"	4:20
2.	"I Want More"	2:25
3.	"Rip Me Apart"	3:42
4.	"I Adore You"	3:22
5.	"Burn It Up (Thunder Mix)"	3:03
6.	"Burn It Up (Lightning Mix)"	3:03
7.	"Burn It Up (Burning Mix)"	3:14
8.	"Burn It Up (Burning Hot Mix)"	3:49
9.	"Burn It Up (Lightning Strikes Again Mix)"	2:41
10.	"Ich Will Alles (Acoustic)"	1:48
11.	"Burn It Up (Acoustic)"	3:42
Total length:		35:09

== Personnel ==
- Doro Pesch – vocals, producer

Tracks 1, 2, 3, 5 (EU) – 1, 2, 5, 7, 14 (US)

- Jürgen Engler – guitars, keyboards, bass, producer, mixing
- Thomas Franke – drums
- Chris Lietz – programming, keyboards, producer, engineer, mixing
- Mario Parillo – guitar solos
- Al Pitrelli – guitar solo on "Dedication"

Tracks 8 (EU) – 3 (US)

- Jürgen Engler – bass, producer, mixing
- Thomas Franke – drums
- Chris Lietz – programming, producer, engineer, mixing
- Steve Stevens – guitar

Tracks 6, 9, 12 (EU) – 4, 10, 13 (US)

- Jimmy Harry – guitars, bass, keyboards, programming, drum programming, producer, engineer, mixing

Tracks 10, 16 (EU) – 6, 12 (US)

- Bruce Bouillet – producer, engineer, mixing
- Lemmy Kilmister – vocals, bass, acoustic guitars, producer, mixing
- Bob Kulick – guitars, producer, mixing
- Eric Singer – drums
- Joe Taylor – guitars

Tracks 4, 11 (EU) – 8, 9 (US)

- Michi Besler – drums
- Andreas Bruhn – guitars, bass, keyboards, producer, engineer, mixing

Track 14 (EU) – 11 (US)

- Nelson Ayres – producers, engineers
- Nick Douglas – bass
- Jürgen Engler – guitars, mixing
- Thomas Franke – drums
- Mike "Metal" Goldberg – producers, engineers
- Chris Lietz – engineer, mixing
- Mario Parillo – rhythm guitar
- Slash – guitar solo
- Kendal Stubbs – programming

Tracks 7, 13, 15 (EU)

- Rudy Kronenberger – producer, engineer, mixing

== Charts ==
Chart (2000)	Peak position
German Albums (Offizielle Top 100)	16
