= Forever Warriors, Forever United =

Studio album by Doro
- Released: 17 August 2018
- Studios: Rockcity Digital Studio, Kirchlengern, Germany
- Genre: Heavy metal
- Length: 100:04
- Label: Nuclear Blast
- Producers: Andreas Bruhn; Doro Pesch; Nick Douglas; Bas Maas; Luca Princiotta; Johnny Dee

Doro chronology
Raise Your Fist (2012)	Forever Warriors, Forever United (2018)	Conqueress: Forever Strong and Proud (2023)

Forever Warriors Forever United is the thirteenth studio album by the German heavy metal singer Doro, released on August 17, 2018 through Nuclear Blast Records. This is Doro's first double album, released separately as split albums, as well as a double package. The album is dedicated to Lemmy Kilmister. The first single "All For Metal" contains several guest vocalists such as Chuck Billy, Jeff Waters, Johan Hegg, Mille Petrozza, and Sabaton. "If I Can't Have You, No One Will", which has a duet with Amon Amarth bellower Johan Hegg, was released as the 2nd Single. The third and fourth singles were "Lift Me Up" and "It Cuts So Deep" respectfully. Five music videos were produced in promotion for the record's release: "All for Metal", "It Cuts So Deep", "If I Can Not Have – No One Will", "Freunde Furs Leben" and "Love's Gone to Hell".

== Background ==
When talking about the album Doro explained that:

"We have toured very intensively over the past few years, gathering so many impressions along the way and meeting so many great people. That really inspired me. The songs and ideas literally flooded our minds and this also didn’t stop in the studio. From over 50 song ideas we quickly had 14 songs for an album, then suddenly 20 and in the end, it was 24. Then I decided to also record one more in our last studio week: 'Caruso'."

== Critical reception ==
Professional ratings
Review scores
Source	Rating
Blabbermouth.net	7.5/10
Distorted Sound	7/10
Ghost Cult Magazine	7.0/10
Grimmgent	6.4/10
Metal Forces	8/10
Metal Hammer	4/5 stars

Reception of the album was generally positive upon its release, with many welcoming Doro's return. A review from Blabbermouth.net stated that "Forever Warriors, Forever United is like that reliable MOTÖRHEAD album you're gonna buy automatically—just because." They spoke fondly of tracks like "All for Metal", "Turn It Up", "Resistance", "Blood, Sweat and Rock 'n' Roll", "Fight Through the Fire", and "Backstage to Heaven". However, they disliked the length of the album, stating that;

"If there's any real problem to "Forever Warriors, Forever United", it's that the sum of all parts is too much of the same helpings in one sitting. To the point even the band is, at times, rolling through the motions. "If I Can't Have You – No One Will" is unfortunately awkward and garish, though Doro is to be commended for shaking things up. Positively, "Bastardos" is shocked with speed and hellfire, and Doro rolls through it with champion vigor. She snarls deliciously on "Turn it Up" and she tragically makes you feel what she's feeling on "Heartbroken", one of the best tunes in the set."

John Kokel from Sonic Perspectives wrote that the album was more of a mixed bag, stating: "We wanted to like this album. Seeing a golden rocker like Graham Bonnet defy age and the odds to deliver a blistering metal album was heartwarming, and we wanted nothing more than to see Doro also deliver the goods. However, there is little to recommend the album, unless one is a longtime Doro fan. The artistic drawing of a 22-year-old Doro on the cover unfortunately does not live up to the dated and faded product within."

== Track listing ==
CD1: Forever Warriors
No.	Title	Writer(s)	Length
1.	"All for Metal"	Andreas Bruhn, Doro	4:02
2.	"Bastardos ('Bastards')"	Bruhn, Doro	3:49
3.	"If I Can't Have You – No One Will"	Doro, Johan Hegg, Thomas N. Bolan	5:09
4.	"Soldier of Metal"	Bruhn, Doro	4:35
5.	"Turn It Up"	Doro, Joey Balin, Thomas N. Bolan	3:23
6.	"Blood, Sweat and Rock 'n' Roll"	Bas Maas, Doro, Johnny Dee, Luca Princiotta, Nick Douglas	4:22
7.	"Don't Break My Heart Again" (Whitesnake cover)	David Coverdale	4:41
8.	"Love's Gone to Hell"	Bruhn, Doro	4:16
9.	"Freunde fürs Leben ('Friends for Life')"	Bruhn, Doro	4:25
10.	"Backstage to Heaven"	Doro, Jack Ponti, Josh Daniel Tate	3:51

Bonus tracks
No.	Title	Writer(s)	Length
11.	"Be Strong"	Bruhn, Doro	3:01
12.	"Black Ballad"	Bruhn, Doro	5:46
13.	"Bring My Hero Back Home Again" (from the film Anuk III – Die Dunkle Flut / The Dark Flood)	Luke Gasser	2:34
Total length:			52:54

CD2: Forever United
No.	Title	Writer(s)	Length
1.	"Resistance"	Andreas Bruhn, Doro	3:14
2.	"Lift Me Up"	Bruhn, Doro	4:50
3.	"Heartbroken"	Bruhn, Doro	4:40
4.	"It Cuts So Deep"	David Bryan, Doro	5:14
5.	"Love Is a Sin"	Bruhn, Doro	4:08
6.	"Living Life to the Fullest"	Bruhn, Doro	4:39
7.	"1000 Years"	Joey Balin, Doro	4:44
8.	"Fight Through the Fire"	Nick Douglas	3:47
9.	"Lost in the Ozone" (Motörhead cover)	Ian Fraser Kilmister, Mikkey Dee, Michael Burston, Phil Campbell	3:26

Bonus tracks
No.	Title	Writer(s)	Length
10.	"Caruso"	Lucio Dalla	3:33
11.	"Tra Como e Coriovallum ('Between Como and Coriovallum')" (instrumental)	Bas Maas, Luca Princiotta	2:40
12.	"Metal Is My Alcohol"	Bruhn, Doro	2:10
Total length:			47:10

== Personnel ==
Band members

- Doro Pesch – vocals
- Bas Maas – guitars
- Luca Princiotta – guitars, keyboards
- Nick Douglas – bass
- Johnny Dee – drums

Additional musicians

- Mille Petrozza (Kreator) – backing vocals on "All for Metal"
- Chuck Billy (Testament) – backing vocals on "All for Metal"
- Sabaton – backing vocals on "All for Metal"
- Warrel Dane (Nevermore, Sanctuary) – backing vocals on "All for Metal"
- Jeff Waters (Annihilator) – backing vocals on "All for Metal"
- Ross the Boss – "All for Metal"
- Rolf "Rock'n'Rolf" Kasparek (Running Wild) – "All for Metal"
- DeTraktor – backing vocals "All for Metal"
- Doug Aldrich (Whitesnake), Dio, Dead Daisies) – guitar solo on "Heartbroken"
- Tommy Bolan (Warlock) – guitars "All for Metal"
- Johan Hegg (Amon Amarth) – duet on "If I Can't Have You, No One Will" and backing vocals on "All for Metal"
- Helge Schneider – saxophone on "Backstage to Heaven"

Production

- Doro Pesch – layout, producer
- Bas Maas – producer
- Luca Princiotta – engineering, producer
- Nick Mitchell – engineering, producer
- Andreas Bruhn – engineering, mixing, producer, arrangements (strings)
- Mike "Metal" Goldberg – engineering, mixing
- Ralph Quick – engineering, mixing
- Jochen Kux – engineering
- Carsten Steffens – engineering
- Jens Dreesen – mastering
- Thomas Ewerhard – layout
- Geoffrey Gillespie – cover art

== Charts ==
Chart performance for Forever Warriors, Forever United
Chart (2018)	Peak position
Austrian Albums (Ö3 Austria)	23
Belgian Albums (Ultratop Flanders)	57
Belgian Albums (Ultratop Wallonia)	92
French Albums (SNEP)	185
German Albums (Offizielle Top 100)	4
Scottish Albums (Official Charts)	68
Swiss Albums (Schweizer Hitparade)	13
UK Independent Albums (Official Charts)	15
UK Rock & Metal Albums (Official Charts)	2
