= Blackeyed Susan (band) =

American rock band

- Origin: Philadelphia, Pennsylvania, United States
- Genres: Hard rock, blues rock
- Years active: 1990–1992
- Label: Mercury
- Past members: Dean Davidson; Erik Levy; Walter Williams; Tony Santoro; Rick Crintini; Chris Branco; Jimmy Marchiano; Jeff Cease; Joey Marchiano

Blackeyed Susan was an American rock band from Philadelphia active between 1990 and 1992. The band was formed by singer and guitarist "Dizzy" Dean Davidson after he left Britny Fox.

== History ==
Blackeyed Susan was formed in 1990 by ex-Britny Fox frontman Dean Davidson. Davidson brought in former Cinderella keyboardist Rick Criniti to play guitar. Bassist Erik Levy, Guitarist Tony Santoro and drummer Chris Branco rounded out the line-up. Compared to Britny Fox, Blackeyed Susan showed a more blues rock influenced sound than the bawdy glam metal of the former.

The band released their first album, Electric Rattlebone, on Mercury Records in 1991. The album was a commercial failure, and Mercury pulled their support for the band while they were on tour. During the supporting tour, Rick Crintini was replaced by Jimmy Marchiano. Blackeyed Susan began working on a followup to Electric Rattlebone called Just a Taste in 1992, but the album ultimately became a demo.

== Members ==
- Dean Davidson – vocals, guitar, harmonica
- Erik Levy – bass, backing vocals
- Walter Williams – bass, backing vocals
- Tony Santoro – guitar, vocals
- Rick Crintini – guitar, vocals, folk instruments
- Chris Branco – drums, percussion
- Dave Barlow – keyboards, backing vocals, folk instruments
- Jimmy Marchiano – guitar, vocals
- Jeff Cease – guitar
- Joey Marchiano – drums

== Discography ==
- Electric Rattlebone (1991, Mercury)
- Just a Taste (1992)
- Rudbeckia (2002)
- Songs from the Bottom (2006)
- Step Inside (2006)
