= Love Me in Black =

Studio album by Doro
- Released: 25 May 1998
- Recorded: Avatar (New York, New York); Atom H (Düsseldorf, Germany)
- Genres: Hard rock, heavy metal, industrial metal
- Length: 56:39
- Label: WEA
- Producers: Jimmy Harry, Fred Maher, Jürgen Engler, Chris Lietz

Doro chronology
Love Me in Black EP (1998)	Love Me in Black (1998)	The Ballads (1998)

Singles from Love Me in Black
- 1. "Do You Like It / Pain / Poison Arrow" Released: 1998; 2. "Long Way Home / Prisoner of Love" Released: 1998

Professional ratings
Review scores
Source	Rating
AllMusic	2.5/5 stars
Metal Hammer (GER)	6/7 stars

Love Me in Black is the sixth solo album of the German female hard rock singer Doro Pesch. It was released in 1998, after the dissolution of her contract with Polygram/Vertigo. Her new label WEA decided to publish the album only in Europe.

== Overview ==
Love Me in Black is the first album released by Doro after her split from the PolyGram/Vertigo label, which had published all her works since 1985. Her new label WEA left her ample freedom for the making of her new album and she worked on it for more than two years, splitting its production in two teams. The first team was formed by the successful American producers and musicians Jimmy Harry and Fred Maher, the second team by former members of the German industrial rock band Die Krupps Jürgen Engler and Chris Lietz, who had already collaborated on Doro's previous album Machine II Machine and on the following EP of remixes.

The result of this double approach to production is surprisingly homogeneous, combining a heavier guitar sound than in the previous albums with plenty of electronic vibes, samples and a large use of drum machines and sequencers. The usual mix of ballads and hard rock songs featured in any Doro album takes on Love Me in Black an industrial and almost experimental spin, which also involves the vocals of the German singer, charged with many effects and distortions.

WEA did not consider the album appropriate for the US market and published it only in Germany, much to Doro's chagrin.

The song "Love Me in Black" was released in EP format and remains a staple in Doro's live show.

The song "Barracuda" is a cover of the Heart's hit single from their album Little Queen of 1977.

The album peaked at position No. 38 on the German Longplay chart.

== Track listing ==
No.	Title	Writer(s)	Length
1.	"Do You Like It?"	Jimmy Harry, Doro Pesch	3:05
2.	"Brutal and Effective"	Harry, Pesch	3:11
3.	"Love Me in Black"	Harry, Pesch	4:48
4.	"Pain"	Jürgen Engler, Pesch, Chris Lietz	4:19
5.	"Tausend mal gelebt" ("Lived a Thousand Times")	Pesch, Gary Scruggs	4:35
6.	"Terrorvision"	Harry, Pesch	2:27
7.	"I Don't Care"	Engler, Pesch, Lietz	3:42
8.	"Kiss Me Good-Bye"	Andreas Bruhn	4:52
9.	"I Want You Back"	Engler, Pesch, Lietz	4:48
10.	"Long Way Home"	René Maué, Pesch	5:04
11.	"Barracuda"	Ann Wilson, Roger Fisher, Nancy Wilson, Michael Derosier	3:11
12.	"Poison Arrow"	Engler, Pesch, Lietz	3:56
13.	"Prisoner of Love"	Harry, Pesch	4:26
14.	"Like an Angel"	Scruggs	4:15
15.	"Dedication" (Limited edition bonus track)	Engler, Pesch, Lietz	3:54
Total length:			56:39

== Credits ==
- Doro Pesch – vocals

=== Tracks 1, 2, 3, 6, 8, 11, 13, 14 ===
- Jimmy Harry – guitars, bass, keyboards, programming, drum programming, producer, mixing except track 8, engineer
- Fred Maher – programming, producer except track 13, engineer
- Damon Weber – drums
- Nick Douglas – bass
- Andrew Goodsight – bass
- John Parthum – engineer on track 3
- Lloyd Puckitt – engineer on track 3
- Chris Lord-Alge – mixing on track 8

=== Tracks 4, 5, 7, 9, 10 ===
- Jürgen Engler – guitars, keyboards, bass, producer
- Chris Lietz – drum programming, keyboards, producer, engineer
- Jeff Bova – additional production on track 10
- Jimmy Bralower – additional production on track 10

== Charts ==
Chart (1998)	Peak position
German Albums (Offizielle Top 100)	38
