= Britny Fox =

American rock band

- Origin: Philadelphia, Pennsylvania, U.S.
- Genres: Glam metal; hard rock
- Years active: 1985–1992; 2000–2003; 2006–2008; 2015–2016; 2022–present (Billy Child's Britny Fox)
- Labels: Columbia, CBS Records, East West, Spitfire
- Past members: Jamie Fletcher; Greg Polcari; Greg D'Angelo; Michael Kelly Smith; Dean Davidson; Tony Destra; Adam Ferraioli; Tommy Krash; Henry Nowak; Billy Childs; Johnny Dee; Tommy Paris; Chris Sanders

Britny Fox is an American glam metal band from the Philadelphia area, initially active from 1985 to 1992 then subsequently reforming from 2000 to 2003, again in 2006 to 2008 and reforming for the final time in 2015 to 2016. They are best known for their music video for "Girlschool" and their minor hit "Long Way to Love" (U.S. No. 100). Bassist Billy Childs has been the only band member to be a part of each of the band's many lineups.

In 2020, Jeff Mezydlo of Yardbarker included them in his list of "the 20 greatest hair metal bands of all time".

== History ==
=== Original lineup (1985–1992) ===
Britny Fox formed in 1985 in Philadelphia. The band was originally fronted by lead vocalist and rhythm guitarist "Dizzy" Dean Davidson. The band also featured Billy Childs on bass, former Cinderella guitarist Michael Kelly Smith on lead guitar and former Cinderella drummer Tony Destra on drums. The idea for the band's name was inspired by Davidson, who named the band in honor of a Welsh ancestor. They were described on a compilation as "trashy Victorian glam".

Thanks to their connections to Cinderella, the band was able to secure a major recording contract. However, the band encountered difficulties when Destra was killed in a car accident on February 8, 1987. Facing a tour, they hired drummer Adam West (aka Adam Ferraioli) temporarily until landing what turned out to be long-term drummer, John DiTeodoro (Johnny Dee), who had been the drummer for the band Waysted.

The band released a demo in 1986 titled In America, which late drummer Tony Destra played on, and a demo in 1987 titled Rock Is Gonna Fight, on which the band's new drummer Adam West played. The band's self-titled debut album, released in 1988, was one of the most successful debuts of the 1988–89 season, achieving RIAA gold status (500,000+ copies). The band held more than 130 shows, which attracted more than 625,000 fans cumulatively; during these shows, the band mostly performed as supporting acts to Poison and Ratt, although in a few shows, they headlined with Warrant as their opening act. They also won Metal Edge magazine's 1988 Reader's Choice Award for Best New Band.

After the release of the band's second album in 1989, Boys in Heat, Davidson departed, and formed the band Blackeyed Susan. He was replaced by Las Vegas native Tommy Paris aka Don Jillson formerly of the band Jillson. Ozzy Osbourne guitarist Zakk Wylde and Poison drummer Rikki Rockett guested on the band's third album, Bite Down Hard, which was released in 1991. However, the popularity of glam metal was on a decline around the time of the album's release, due to the rising popularity of the alternative rock/grunge movement. Britny Fox disbanded in 1992 for various reasons.

=== Reunions (2000–present) ===
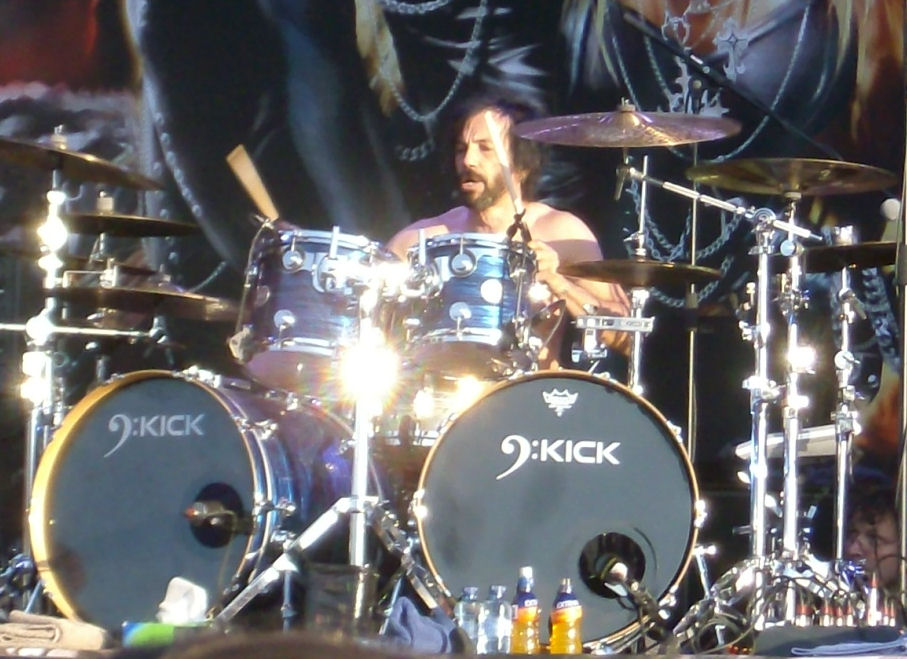
Drummer Johnny Dee performing live with Britny Fox, 2013

Britny Fox reunited in 2000 with the same lineup before their disbandment and released a fourth studio album, Springhead Motorshark, in 2003. The band toured the US and Europe in 2007 and 2008. Guitarist Tommy Krash and former White Lion drummer Greg D'Angelo was supposed to join at that time, but he broke his foot during rehearsal and was replaced by Henry Now.

As of late 2007, Britny Fox reformed under original bassist Billy Childs. The other former members of this lineup were lead vocalist and rhythm guitarist Jamie Fletcher, lead guitarist Greg Polcari, and drummer Henry Now.

Bassist Billy Childs and the new lineup had a minor but billed role in the horror film Incest Death Squad (2009). Childs also played bass in the North American Led Zeppelin tribute band Get the Led Out.

In 2010, Dean Davidson unsuccessfully attempted to reunite the surviving members of the original lineup.

On April 25, 2015, the band announced that they had reunited with bassist Billy Childs, drummer Johnny Dee, long-time singer/rhythm guitarist Tommy Paris, and new lead guitarist Chris Sanders as their lineup and that they were recording a new album. In a 2017 interview, Childs stated that the album project had been abandoned, but he stopped short of saying that the band had broken up. In 2018, Sanders joined fellow glam metal band Ratt.

In 2022, Billy Childs formed his own incarnation of Britny Fox without the involvement of any other past members. They toured throughout 2023.

More recently in 2023, former lead guitarist Michael Kelly Smith confirmed in several new interviews that he was in touch with all surviving original members and was considering bringing an official version of the band back for a reunion with the lineup from the first two albums. Smith also teased the possibility of a new studio album.

== Members ==
=== Billy Childs' Britny Fox ===
- Billy Childs – bass guitar, backing vocals (1985–present)
- Ronnie Rogers – lead vocals, rhythm guitar (2022–present)
- Greg Polcari – lead guitar, backing vocals (2007–2014; 2022–present)
- Henry Nowak – drums, backing vocals (2007–2014; 2022–present)

=== Past ===
==== Lead vocals/rhythm guitar ====
- Dean Davidson (1985–1990)
- Tommy Paris (1990–1992; 2000-2003; 2006-2007; 2015–2016)
- Jamie Fletcher (2008–2014)

==== Lead guitar ====
- Michael Kelly Smith (1985–1992; 2000–2003)
- Tommy Krash (2006–2007)
- Greg Polcari (2007–2014)

==== Drums ====
- Tony Destra (1985–1987; died 1987)
- Adam Ferraioli (1987–1988) (died 2023)
- Johnny Dee (1988–1992; 2000–2003; 2015–2016)
- Greg D'Angelo (2006–2007)
- Henry Now (2007–2014)

==== Touring keyboards ====
- Bobby Bunten (1988–1989)

=== Lineups ===
(1985–1987)	Dean Davidson – lead vocals, rhythm guitar; Michael Kelly Smith – lead guitar, backing vocals; Billy Childs – bass, backing vocals; Tony Destra – drums, percussion
(February–March 1987)	Dean Davidson – lead vocals, rhythm guitar; Michael Kelly Smith – lead guitar, backing vocals; Billy Childs – bass, backing vocals; Adam West – drums, percussion
(1987–1990)	Dean Davidson – lead vocals, rhythm guitar; Michael Kelly Smith – lead guitar, backing vocals; Billy Childs – bass, keyboards, backing vocals; Johnny Dee – drums, percussion, backing vocals
(1990–1992), (2000–2003)	Tommy Paris – lead vocals, rhythm guitar, keyboards; Michael Kelly Smith – lead guitar, backing vocals; Billy Childs – bass, backing vocals; Johnny Dee – drums, percussion, backing vocals
(2006–2007)	Tommy Paris – lead vocals, rhythm guitar, keyboards; Tommy Krash – lead guitar, backing vocals; Billy Childs – bass, backing vocals; Greg D'Angelo – drums, percussion, backing vocals
(2007)	Tommy Paris – lead vocals, rhythm guitar, keyboards; Tommy Krash – lead guitar, backing vocals; Billy Childs – bass, backing vocals; Henry Now – drums, percussion, backing vocals
(Late 2007–2014)	Jamie Fletcher – lead vocals, rhythm guitar; Greg Polcari – lead guitar, backing vocals; Billy Childs – bass, backing vocals; Henry Now – drums, percussion, backing vocals
(2015–2016)	Billy Childs – bass, backing vocals; Tommy Paris – lead vocals, rhythm guitar, keyboards; Johnny Dee – drums, percussion, backing vocals; Chris Sanders – lead guitar

== Discography ==
=== Studio albums ===
Year	Album	US	RIAA Certification	Label
1988	Britny Fox	39	Gold	CBS
1989	Boys in Heat	79	-	CBS
1991	Bite Down Hard	-	-	EastWest
2003	Springhead Motorshark	-	-	Spitfire

=== Video albums ===
Year	Album	US	RIAA Certification	Label
1989	Year of the Fox	-	-	CBS

=== Live albums ===
Year	Album	US	RIAA Certification	Label
2001	Long Way to Live!	-	-	Spitfire
2002	Live at Froggy's	-	-	Britny Fox Records
2006	Extended Versions	-	-	SBME Special Markets

=== Compilation albums ===
Year	Album	US	RIAA Certification	Label
2001	The Best of Britny Fox	-	-	CBS

=== Singles ===
Year	Single	Chart positions			Album
Year	Single	US Hot 100	US Main Rock	UK	Album
1988	"Long Way to Love"	100	33	-	Britny Fox
1989	"Girlschool"		-	-	Britny Fox
1989	"Save the Weak"	-	-	-	Britny Fox
1989	"Standing in the Shadows"	-	-	101	Boys in Heat
1990	"Dream On"	-	34	-	Boys in Heat
1991	"Louder"	-	-	-	Bite Down Hard
1991	"Over and Out"	-	-	-	Bite Down Hard
2003	"Is It Real?"	-	-	-	Springhead Motorshark
2007	"Girlschool" "Long Way to Love"	-	-	-	Non-album single

=== Demos ===
- In America (1986)
- Rock Is Gonna Fight (1987)
- The Bite Down Hard Demo Sessions (2003)
- Forbidden Fruits: The Bite Down Hard Demos, Volume I (2020)
- Forbidden Fruits: The Bite Down Hard Demos, Volume II (2020)

=== Bootlegs ===
- Gudbuy T'Dean (2001)
- Tommy Krash and Friends, Britny Fox the Acoustic Sessions 2019

=== Other appearances ===
Year	Album	Song	US	RIAA Certification	Label
1991	Nintendo: White Knuckle Scorin'	"Turn On"	-	-	MCA
2019	Tommy Krash and Friends, BRITNY FOX the Acoustic Sessions	Compilation	-	-	DEKO

=== Soundtrack ===
Year	Song	Movie	Description
1988	"Living on the Edge"	Iron Eagle II	Starring Louis Gossett Jr.

== See also ==
- List of glam metal bands and artists
