= Tony Destra =

American drummer

- Born: September 20, 1954
- Died: February 8, 1987 (aged 32)
- Occupations: Musician
- Instruments: Drums
- Years active: 1982–1987
- Formerly of: Cinderella; Britny Fox; Enforcer

Tony Destra (September 20, 1954 – February 8, 1987), was an American drummer who played for the glam metal bands Cinderella and Britny Fox. Before Cinderella or Britny Fox, Destra was the drummer for another popular Philadelphia area band called Enforcer. Destra played on Cinderella's indie 45 of "Shake Me" and "Somebody Save Me". After he left Cinderella, Destra joined Britny Fox in 1985. He played on the Britny Fox demo In America in 1986.

In Cinderella, Destra was replaced by drummer Jim Drnec. In Britny Fox Destra was replaced by drummer Adam F Ferraioli who was then himself replaced by long-term drummer Johnny Dee.

Destra died in a car accident on February 8, 1987.

== Discography ==
=== With Cinderella ===
Demos

=== With Britny Fox ===
In America (demo) (1986)
