= Dean Davidson =

American musician

- Also known as: "Dizzy Dean"
- Origin: Philadelphia, Pennsylvania
- Genres: Glam metal, hard rock, folk rock
- Occupation: Musician
- Instruments: Vocals, guitar, bass, drums, percussion, harmonica, piano
- Years active: 1985–2014

"Dizzy" Dean Davidson is an American singer, guitarist, and drummer from Philadelphia, Pennsylvania. He was a founding member, lead vocalist and rhythm guitarist of the glam metal band Britny Fox from 1985 to 1990. After leaving Britny Fox, Davidson formed the band Blackeyed Susan. The band disbanded in 1992 but reunited in 2000 without Davidson. In 2010, Davidson attempted to reunite Britny Fox but did not get past the talking stage. The band name, Britny Fox was named after the Welsh coat of arms of one of Davidson's 18th century ancestors. Davidson later expressed a dislike for the Britny Fox material, saying he was "controlled by management and the label" and calling the music "prefabricated".

In 2007, Davidson released a folk rock album called Drive My Karma.

== Discography ==
Britny Fox

- Britny Fox (1988)
- Boys in Heat (1989)
- The Best of Britny Fox (2001)

Blackeyed Susan

- Electric Rattlebone (1991)
- Just a Taste (1992) (unreleased)

Jarod Dean

- A Weekend Soul Massage (1999)

Love Saves the Day

- Superstar (2001)

Solo

- Drive My Karma (2007)
- Wouldn’t Change A Thing - Single (2014)
