= Nick Douglas =

American bassist

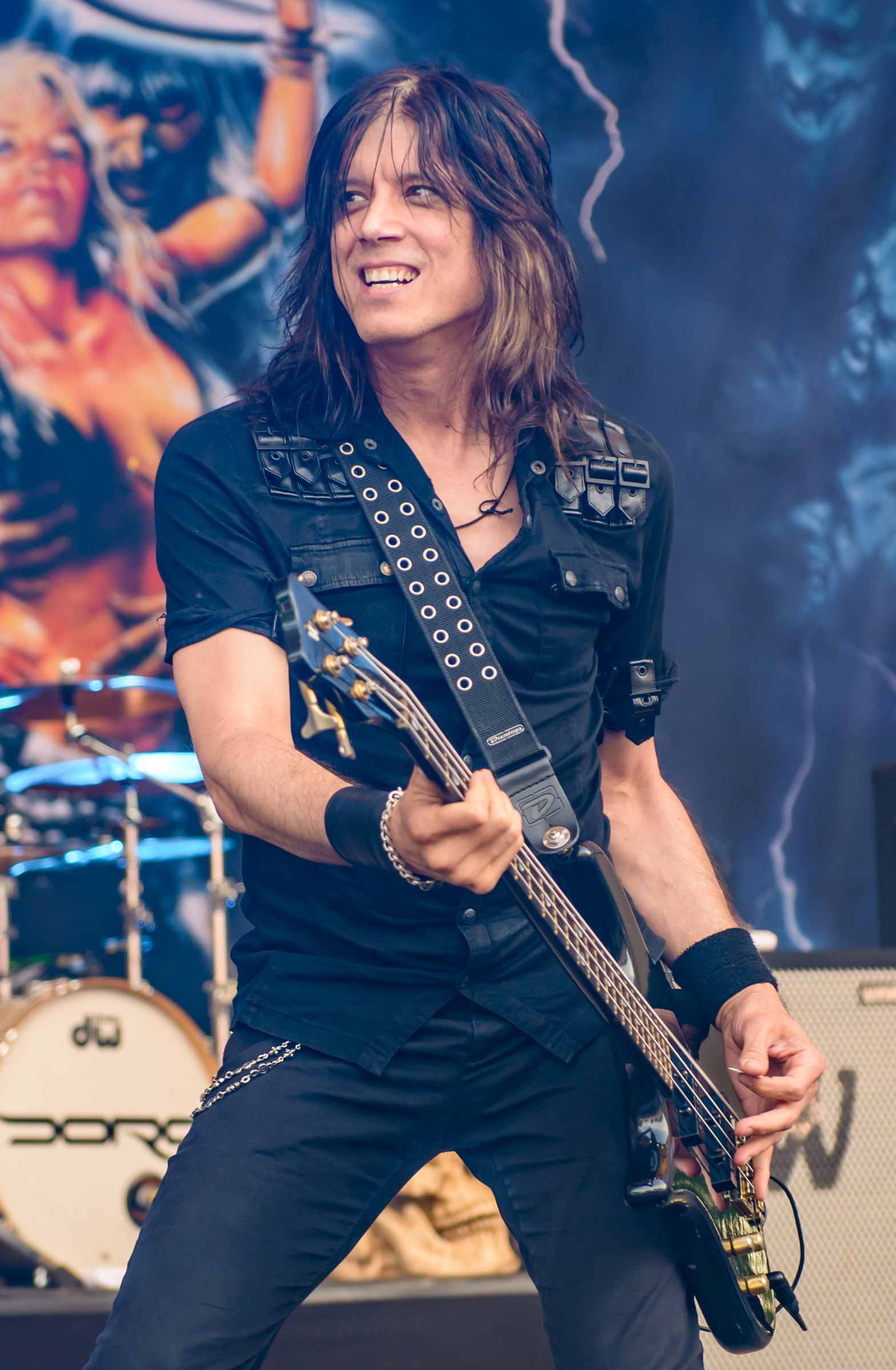
- Douglas live with Doro in 2016

Background information
- Birth name: Nicholas Charles Douklias
- Also known as: Nick Mitchell
- Born: August 31, 1967 (age 58); Camden, New Jersey, U.S.
- Genres: Heavy metal, hard rock, rock
- Occupation(s): Musician, songwriter
- Instrument(s): Bass, keyboards, vocals
- Years active: 1986–present
- Labels: Starlander, Painkiller, Metalville
- Member of: Doro
- Formerly of: Deadly Blessing

Nick Douglas (born Nicholas Charles Douklias; August 31, 1967), also credited as Nick Mitchell, is an American rock musician, best known for being the bass player of Doro Pesch's band from 1990 to 2020 and since 2025. He released a solo album in 2001 and a second album in late February 2017. He worked with several other bands and artists, including Chris Caffery and BLAZE.

== Biography ==
Nick was born in Camden, New Jersey, the son of a US Navy Father, and studied architecture before pursuing a career in music. He grew up listening to his Mother's collection of soul, Motown and 60s and 70s British rock records. He began playing bass at age 13 to differentiate from his brother and others in his neighborhood who had opted for the guitar. He took bass guitar lessons in his youth.

At the age of 19, he became a member of the heavy metal band Deadly Blessing from Turnersville, New Jersey, with which he wrote and recorded songs for their first album, titled Ascend from the Cauldron, published by New Renaissance Records in 1988. Two years later, he decided to leave the band and moved to New York City, where he changed his stage name to Nick Douglas and had brief experiences with a few New York area bands. In the summer of 1990, Douglas auditioned for the German hard rock singer Doro Pesch and was chosen among many candidates. Doro is the former singer of the German heavy metal band Warlock, which dissolved in 1989, and went on to become a successful solo artist. With Doro, Douglas recorded several albums and has performed in Europe, North America and all over the world.

Douglas has also worked with other bands and musicians. He was in the lineup of Blaze Bayley's band BLAZE for the tours of 2004 and 2005, along with other members of Doro's band Oliver Palotai and Luca Princiotta. In 2005, he was the bass player for Chris Caffery, on his Faces tour and at the end of 2005, he reunited with his first band Deadly Blessing, which had been inactive for a long time, for some live performances and the release of an album containing rare and previously unreleased material.

At the end of the 1990s, Douglas began writing and recording songs that eventually made the album, Through the Pane. The album was released independently in 2001 and released in Europe at the end of 2006 on Painkiller Records.

Douglas played bass on a track on Chris Caffery third solo album Pins and Needles in 2007 and went on tour with both Caffery and Doro. He also started to record a new solo album, Regenerations, to which he devoted himself to during the short breaks between tours.

He also played with New York and Pennsylvania based acts like Mike Rocket and the Stars, EBE and the cover band American Tabloid, featuring also the drummer of Doro's band Johnny Dee. He is also the bassist and lead singer of the Nick Douglas band, which features current and former members of Doro's touring band, and performs his own music. Douglas composes and records music in his home studio and licensed some of his compositions to movie and TV companies.

Nick's second solo album, Regenerations, was released in February and March 2017 in Europe and The US respectively on the German label, Metalville. It went to #4 on the Metal Contraband "most added to radio" charts in North America.

In 2015 Nick began working with the Blues band The B. Christopher Band for the production of their albums.

Starting in 2016, Nick narrated two audiobooks for Native American novelist Craig Strete, The Bleeding Man and Other Science Fiction Stories and Paint Your Face on a Drowning in the River.

== Equipment ==
Douglas endorses Warwick basses and amplifiers and usually uses a Katana model on stage and in the studio. He also uses DR Strings and InTune Picks.

== Discography ==
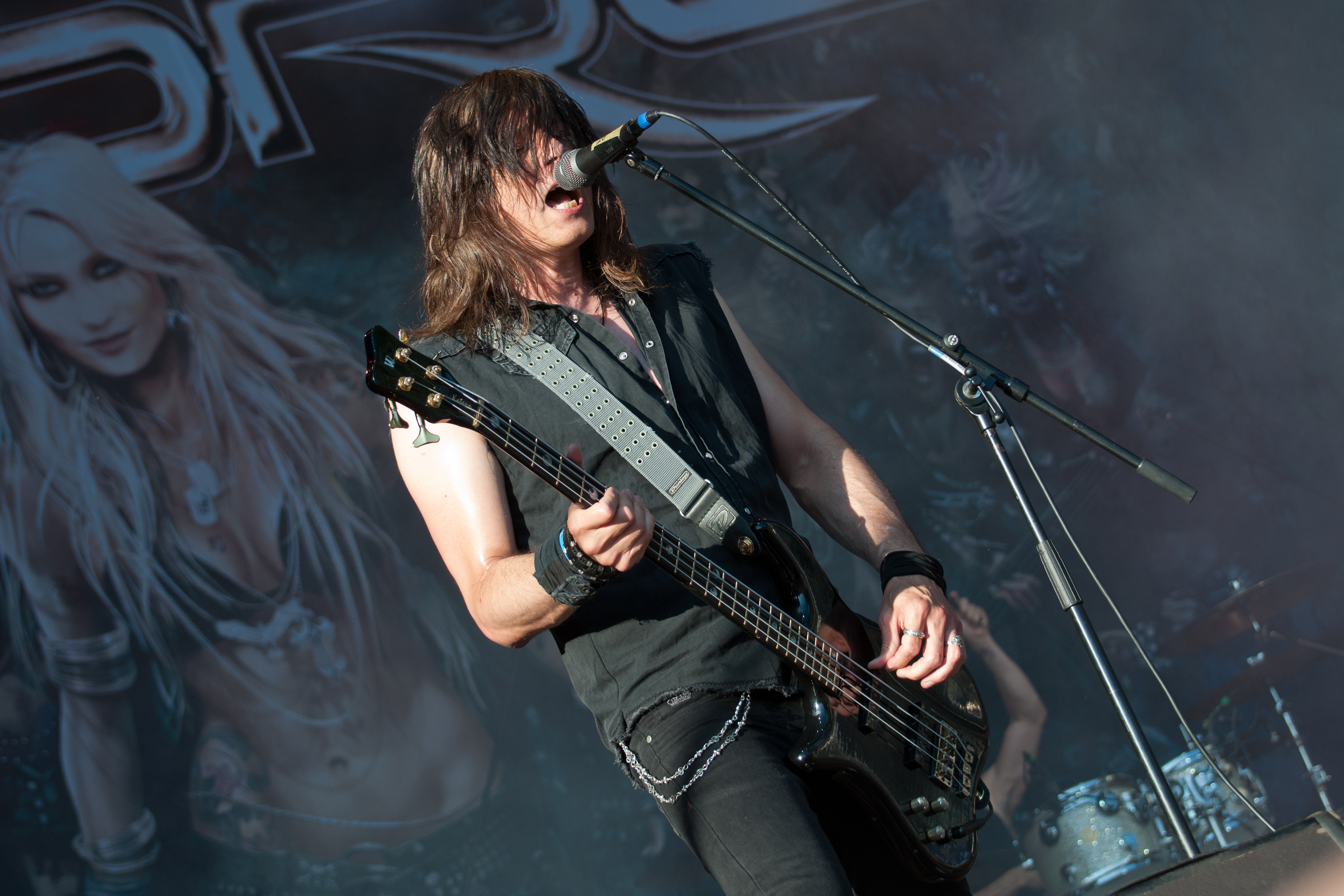
Douglas at Masters of Rock 2018

=== Solo albums ===
- Through the Pane (2001)
- Regenerations (2017)

=== With Deadly Blessing ===
- Ascend from the Cauldron (1988)

=== With Doro ===
- Doro Live (1993)
- Angels Never Die (1993)
- Machine II Machine (1995)
- Love Me in Black (1998)
- Calling the Wild (2000)
- Fight (2002)
- Classic Diamonds (2004)
- Warrior Soul (2006)
- Fear No Evil (2009)
- 25 Years in Rock... and Still Going Strong (2010)
- Raise Your Fist (2012)
- Forever Warriors, Forever United (2018)

=== With Chris Caffery ===
- Pins and Needles (2007)

=== With The B. Christopher Band ===
- Surfing with a Vintage Lady (2021)
- Snapshots from the Second Floor (2022)
- 106 Miles to Chicago (2024)

== Audiobooks (Narration) ==
=== By Craig Kee Strete ===
- The Bleeding Man and Other Science Fiction Stories (2015)
- Paint Your Face on a Drowning in the River (2023)
