= Johnny Dee (musician) =

American heavy metal drummer

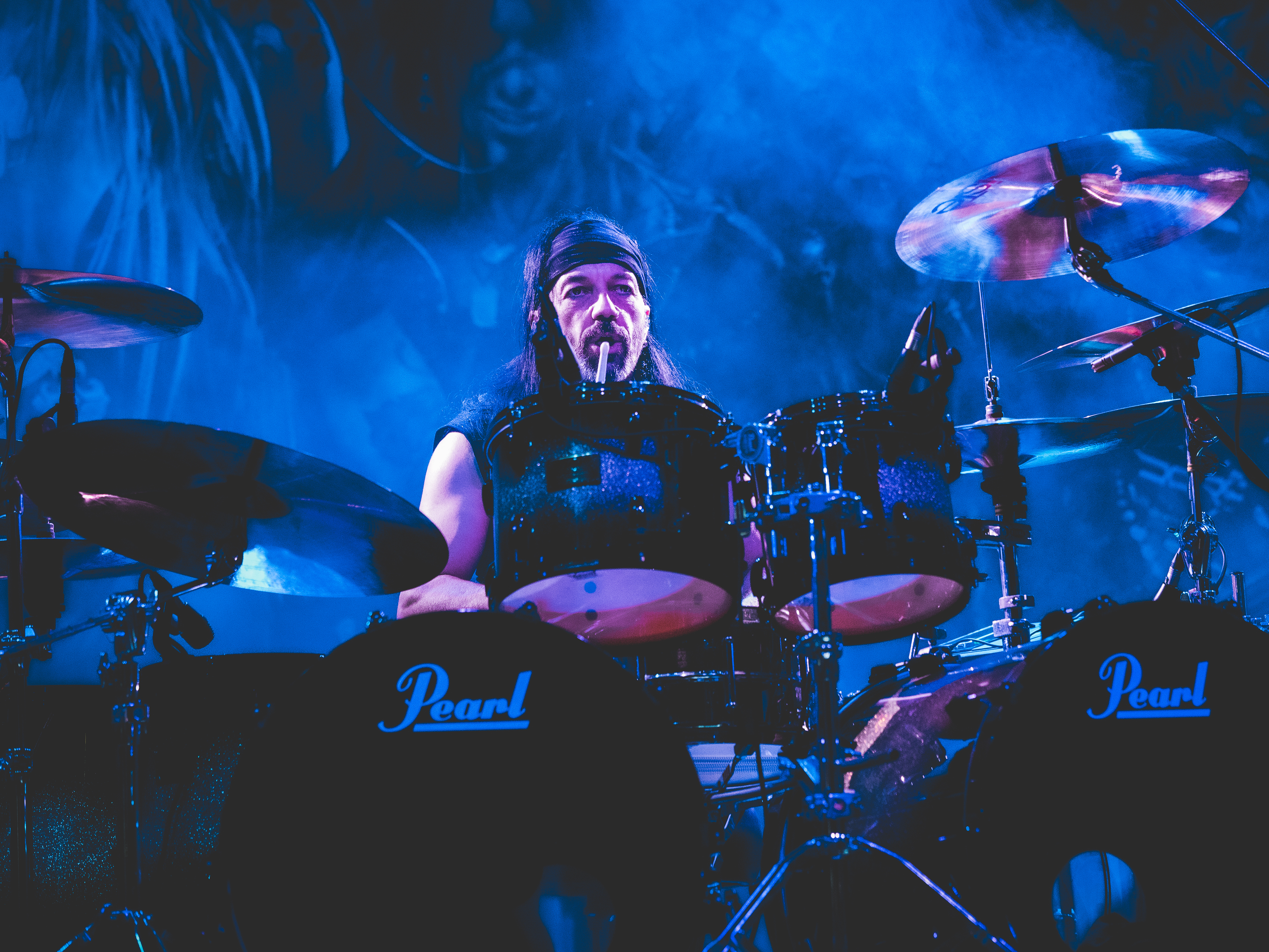
- Dee performing with Doro in 2023

Background information
- Born: John DiTeodoro, Jr. April 6, 1963 (age 63); Conshohocken, Pennsylvania, United States
- Genres: Heavy metal, glam metal, hard rock
- Occupations: Drummer, songwriter, tour manager, graphic artist
- Instruments: Drums, percussion, vocals
- Years active: 1985–present
- Labels: Columbia, East West, Retrospect, WEA, SPV/Steamhammer, AFM, Nuclear Blast

Johnny Dee (born John DiTeodoro, Jr., April 6, 1963) is an American heavy metal drummer.

He is best known for being a member of the glam metal band Britny Fox, and as a member of Doro Pesch's band since 1993. In the past Dee played in the bands Mariah and Waysted, as well as collaborated with artists such as Blaze Bayley and guitarist Jack Frost.

== Career ==
John DiTeodoro jr. was born and raised in Conshohocken, Pennsylvania, a suburb of Philadelphia, where he attended Spring Mill Elementary and Plymouth-Whitemarsh Senior High, graduating at Central Montco Technical High School in Commercial Art. He is a self-taught musician, who started playing drums at the age of 12. The first influences on his drumming style came from Peter Criss (KISS) and Ian Paice (Deep Purple). His first experiences with local bands put him in contact with other young musicians of the neighborhood, like Billy Degley, later known as Billy Childs, and other future members of Britny Fox.

Johnny Dee began his career as drummer for the heavy metal band World War III in his home town Philadelphia around 1985, recording their self-titled debut in the same year. A short time later, he joined the British hard rock band Waysted, with which he recorded the album Save Your Prayers in 1986. When Waysted disbanded, he returned to Philadelphia in 1987 to replace temporary drummer Adam West in the glam metal band Britny Fox, who himself had replaced the late original drummer Tony Destra. The band's first two albums, Britny Fox (1988) and Boys in Heat (1989), climbed the charts and achieved considerable success. Singer and guitarist Dean Davidson left the band in 1990 to form Blackeyed Susan and Britny Fox continued with his replacement Tommy Paris, but did not get the good results of previous years. The first album with Paris, Bite Down Hard (1991), did not find a receptive market and sold poorly.

In 1991, Dee recorded with the Minneapolis glam metal band Mariah their second album Somewhere Between Heaven and Earth, which was published in a cassette-only limited edition. The band line-up comprised D.O.A. and Waysted keyboardist Jimmy DiLella and Tim Compton, former guitarist of Lynn Allen. DiLella had been a session musician for Britny Fox, but had never played with the group before their premature disbandment in 1993. However, he was instrumental in the hiring of his friend Johnny Dee to replace drummer Chris Branco in the Doro Pesch's touring band, where he was the keyboard player. In 2005, Retrospect Records released the two albums of Mariah, the second with Johnny Dee on drums. In 2007, the same label released another album of the band titled III, featuring again Dee.

The fast commercial decline of glam metal acts in favor of grunge and alternative rock, caused the dissolution of many bands like Britny Fox, leaving their members unemployed. Dee was lucky to have found jobs as musician in Europe with Doro, who was a still a successful and charting artist in Germany, and in the US East Coast with LeCompt, a cover band formed by former Tangier vocalist Mike LeCompt which included also Billy Childs on bass. He recorded with Doro the live album Doro Live (1993) and several studio albums, remaining to this day the official drummer of the band. He also served as tour manager for Doro's US tours. In the 90s, when not engaged in European tours with Doro or with LeCompt, Dee worked with a third band that he had founded with Tommy Paris in Philadelphia, called Uncle Edna. They released a self-titled EP in 1996.

In 2000, Britny Fox reformed and went on tour with Dee on drums, releasing the live album Long Way to Live! (2001) and their fourth studio album Springhead Motorshark in 2003. During the summer of 2002, Dee played on tour also with Blaze Bayley (ex-singer of Iron Maiden and Wolfsbane), in support to the American thrash metal band Overkill on a European tour. In 2003, Dee, along with bassist Billy Childs, worked on the solo project of guitarist Jack Frost (Savatage, Metalium), releasing the album Raise Your Fist to Metal.

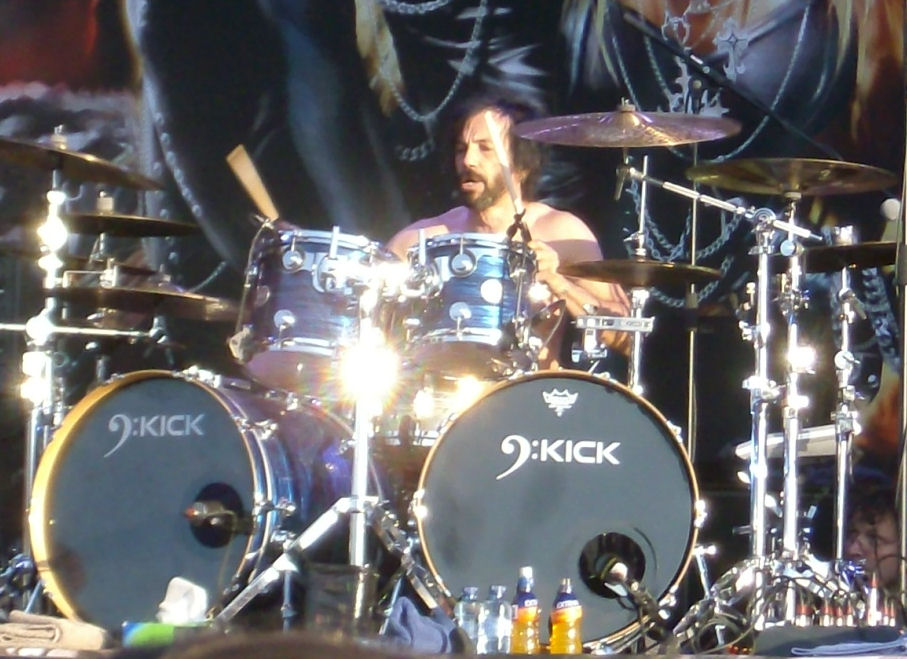
Johnny Dee playing live with Doro in 2013

Dee was involved in a project to re-record classic UFO songs in 2006, along with former UFO and Waysted guitarist Paul Chapman and the former MSG lead singer Robin McAuley.

In 2008, Britny Fox officially announced a new line-up, without Johnny Dee on drums. A new reunion was announced again in 2010 by former singer Dean Davidson, without the previous agreement of the other band members.

On September 3, 2022, it was announced that Johnny Dee is the new drummer for Tyketto, following the departure of long time sticksman Michael Clayton.

== Equipment ==
Johnny Dee plays DW drums and Paiste cymbals, using Ahead drumsticks and Evans Drumheads.

== Discography ==
=== With World War III ===
- World War III (1985)

=== With Waysted ===
- Save Your Prayers (1986)

=== With Britny Fox ===
Studio albums

- Britny Fox (1988)
- Boys in Heat (1989)
- Bite Down Hard (1991)
- Springhead Motorshark (2003)

Live albums

- Gudbuy T'Dean (1997 – unofficial)
- Long Way to Live! (2001)
- Live at Froggy's (2001)
- Extended Versions (2006)

Compilations

- The Best of Britny Fox (2001)
- The Bite Down Hard Demo Sessions (2002)

=== With Mariah ===
- Somewhere Between Heaven and Earth (1991)
- III (2007)

=== With Uncle Edna ===
- Uncle Edna (1996)

=== With Doro ===
Studio albums

- Machine II Machine (1995)
- Fight (2002)
- Classic Diamonds (2004)
- Warrior Soul (2006)
- Fear No Evil (2009)
- Raise Your Fist (2012)
- Forever Warriors, Forever United (2018)
- Conqueress Forever Strong and Proud (2023)

Live albums

- Doro Live (1993)
- 25 Years in Rock... and Still Going Strong (2010)

=== Other appearances ===
- Jack Frost – Raise Your Fist to Metal (2003)
- Jim Stevens – "Connective Energies" (2017) appears on 8 songs
