= Das Album (disambiguation) =

Das Album is a 2020 album by Thomas Anders and Florian Silbereisen.

Das Album may also refer to:

- Das Album, a 2021 studio album by We Butter the Bread with Butter
- Das Album, a 2020 album by Anton featuring DJ Ötzi
- Das Album, a 1996 album by Der Wolf
- Das Album, a 2002 album by Hertzton
- Das Album, 2009 and 2018 albums by Muhabbet
- Das Album, a 1997 album by Michael Kersting with Der Wolf
