= Gobbel =

Gobbel or Göbbel may refer to:

- Gunther Göbbel, German singer and music producer, also part of Meant 2 Be and Lemon Ice
- Sylvia Gobbel, German artist and model
- Ulrich van Gobbel (born 1971), Dutch football player and coach

== See also ==
- Goebel (disambiguation)
- Goebbels (disambiguation)
- Gobbeldygook or gobbel dy gook, Gibberish, also called jibber-jabber, a speech that is (or appears to be) nonsense
