= In Medias Res (disambiguation) =

In medias res is a narrative technique in which a story opens in the middle or end rather than the beginning.

In Medias Res may also refer to:

- In Medias Res (band), a Canadian indie band
- In Medias Res (Krypteria album), 2005
- In Medias Res (PMtoday album), 2010
- "In Medias Res", a song by Los Campesinos! from Romance Is Boring, 2010
- InMediaRes Productions, an American role-playing game company
