= Fame Academy (German TV series) =

- Genre: Interactive talent show Reality
- Presented by: Nova Meierhenrich
- Country of origin: Germany
- Original language: German
- No. of seasons: 1 (2003)

Production
- Producer: Endemol Germany

Original release
- Network: RTL II; Tele 5 MTV2
- Release: 7 September – 30 November 2003

Related
- Star Academy

Fame Academy was a German reality television program and casting show launched on RTL II in 2003 under the same format of the international TV franchise Star Academy in search of a boy band to be launched by the programme from a number of contestants applying. The programme was not successful in comparison to the more successful counterparts like the Spanish Operación Triunfo or the French Star Academy. The reception however was lukewarm in Germany with an average of 900,000 tuning in. The series was discontinued after initial season. Winners went on to form the band Become One.

== Season 1 (2003) ==
The German Fame Academy was launched on 7 September 2003 on RTL II, with additional broadcasts on Tele 5 and MTV2. The season extended until 30 November 2003 when winners were announced. Every week, depending on the perceived quality of their performances, contestants would be put into either "safe" or "danger" zones. Anyone in the latter had to undergo a system of voting by the other participants to determine which one would then be forced to leave. The programme adopted its theme, the song made famous by Irene Cara called "Fame" performed by the contestants for a potential spot in the band to be launched.

The band that emerged from the talent show was to be named Become One with six male and female members. It was hosted by Nova Meierhenrich and produced by Endemol. The main broadcasts each lasted from 1 to 2 hours, with supporting behind-the-scenes broadcast on a daily basis. The six finalists that made to the final to form the winning band Become One were Ji-In Cho (later part of Krypteria, followed by And Then She Came), Carolin Arnold, Sedat Türüc (later part of Meant 2 Be), Thomas Bopp, David Hernandez (earlier a dancer with No Angels) and Christopher Komm. Charting hits by the band included "I Don't Need Your Alibis" (their debut single release), and follow-up "Come Clean" before disbanding in July 2004.

RTL II did not renew the broadcast due to is relative failure as compared with its British, Spanish and French counterparts.
