= Become One =

German boy/girl pop band

- Origin: Germany
- Genres: Pop
- Years active: 2004
- Past members: Thomas Bopp; David Hernandez; Christopher Komm; Sedat Türüc; Ji-In Cho; Carolin Arnold

Become One was a German boy/girl pop band. The six-members of the band were chosen by a casting German reality television show called Fame Academy, a German version of the international Star Academy franchise and hosted by Nova Meierhenrich on the German television channel RTL II. The band was formed in 2003 and had two singles and one album.

The debut single with the winning song "I Don't Need Your Alibis". The single was produced by Michael Kersting and released the following week after the finale. It charted in Germany reaching number 16 staying 9 weeks in the German Official Singles Chart. It was also a hit in Switzerland and Austria where the show was also available. The band released their album 1 in January 2004. The album reached number 24 in Germany staying 4 weeks in the albums chart. A follow-up single "Come Clean", a cover of the song with the same name by Hilary Duff, did poorly in sales. The band announced they were disbanding on 25 July 2004, after a series of concerts culminating at Freizeit-Land Geiselwind, near Nuremberg.

== Members ==
The members (winning finalists from the series were:

Males

- Thomas Bopp (born 22 March 1981)
- David Hernandez (24 April 1978) (earlier a dancer with the German girl band No Angels)
- Christopher Komm. (born 19 May 1983)
- Sedat Türüc [Türüç](15 July 1978)

Females

- Ji-In Cho (born 30 December 1976)
- Carolin Arnold (born 16 October 1978)

== After split-up ==
=== Ji-In Cho ===
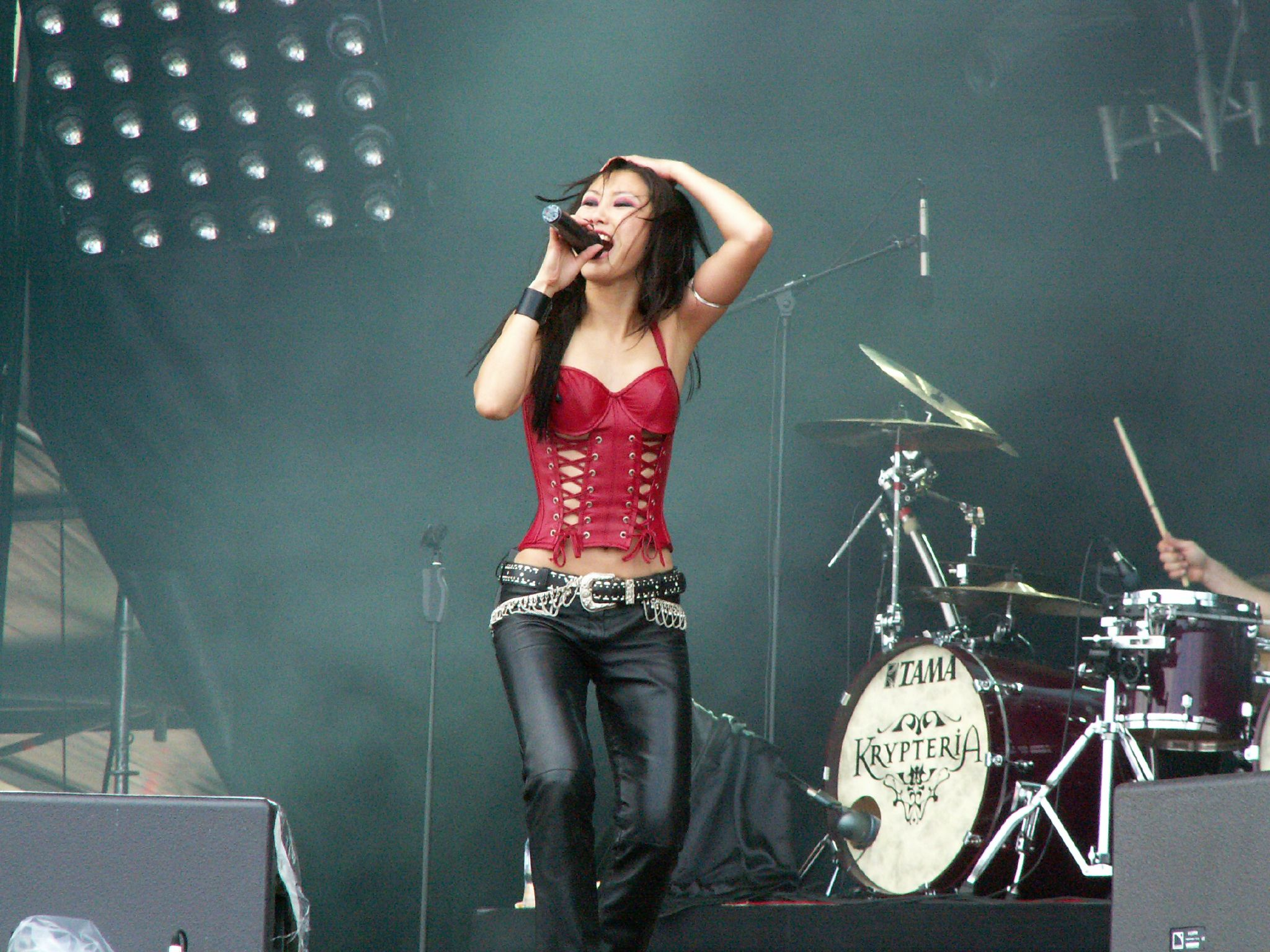
Ji-In Cho

Ji-In Cho became part of the German the symphonic metal band Krypteria in December 2004 and the band's lead vocalist and pianist. The band's single "Liberatio" was used for a charity campaign in aid of the tsunami victims in Southeast Asia. The band went on hiatus in 2012 and was reformed as And Then She Came in 2016.

=== Sedat Türüc ===
Sedat Türüc, the band member of Turkish origin went on to form the duo Meant 2 Be with Gunther Göbbel (also known as Geeno), a popular contestant who had reached Final 5 of another reality television series Deutschland sucht den Superstar (DSDS) in 2003/2004 in its second season. The duo released their Latin-influenced single "Caramba!". Göbbel went on to form another band Lemon Ice, a German cover band with the rapper Jay Low.

Sedat Türüc continued with a solo career turning his attention to the Turkish market and became a successful pop and dance star in Turkey and Turkish diaspora with a series of releases and music videos under the mononym Sedat. Popular songs by him included "Bütün Kalbimle", "Horoz", "Tutmayin Beni" and as Sedat TRC in the dance hit "Hoppa" featuring D&G and Big Shafiq, amongst others. He released a studio album ASI in 2010.

== Discography ==
=== Albums ===
Year	Album	Peak positions
Year	Album	GER
2004	1	24

=== Singles ===
Year	Single	Peak positions			Album
Year	Single	GER	AUT)	SUI	Album
2003-2004	"Don't Need Your Alibis"	16	33	52	1
2004	"Come Clean"	61	–	–	1
