= Türüç =

Türüc is a Turkish surname. Notable people with the surname include:

- Deniz Türüç (born 1993), Turkish footballer
- Sedat Türüc, or mononym Sedat, German Turkish singer, also part of group Become One
