= PMtoday =

American post-hardcore band

Pmtoday
- Origin: Jacksonville, Arkansas, USA
- Genres: Progressive rock; post-hardcore; alternative rock; indie rock; emo
- Years active: 2003–2011
- Label: Rise Records
- Spinoffs: Move Orchestra
- Past members: Connor Brogan; Ryan Brogan; Cuinn Brogan; Jerrod Morgan; Justin Coulter; Nick Hargett; Kevin Middleton
- Website: www.myspace.com/pmtoday

PMtoday was a progressive post-hardcore band from Jacksonville, Arkansas, formerly signed to Rise Records. They released two EPs as well as two full-length albums, And Then the Hurricane in 2007 and In Medias Res in 2010. The band consisted of brothers Connor, Ryan, and Cuinn Brogan, as well as Jerrod Morgan.

== History ==
=== Formation and early years (2003–2007) ===
PMtoday was formed in 2003 in Jacksonville, Arkansas by brothers Connor and Ryan Brogan, with Connor as lead vocalist as well as guitar, and Ryan as back-up vocals and drummer. The other members were bassist Nick Hargett, and guitarist and backing vocalist Justin Coulter. The band started out playing Blink 182 and Jimmy Eat World covers. The name was not decided until they became a band playing their own music. According to an interview with Spinner, the band name was only made because it "sounded kind of cool and was an interesting name", and was originally meant as a joke between the brother's classmates but the name soon stuck. The band began playing local shows and charted very highly on statewide Purevolume charts which gave the band high visibility in Arkansas. Their first 5-song EP, which featured a sound heavily influenced by Blink 182, was offered for free upon its release in 2004. The following winter a 4-song EP was released. Guitarist Justin Coulter left the band in June 2005, and Kevin Middleton was found that July as his replacement. Around the same time, the band announced that all of their songs except "This Disease" would be discarded, and the band would be writing new songs.

=== ...And Then the Hurricane and line-up changes (2007-2009) ===
The band would continue go on small tours and play local shows without recording new material until 2007 when And Then the Hurricane, the band's first album, was recorded in Atlanta at Mayday Sound Studios. At this time, all of the band's members had finished high school and were free to go on national tours. However, only a few months after the release of their debut album, the band underwent several line-up changes.
In December 2007, bassist Nick Hargett announced he would leave the band after the current tour. PMtoday then asked Connor and Ryan's younger brother Cuinn, who was responsible for the band's lighting and merchandise, to replace him. Shortly after, however, guitarist Kevin Middleton also decided to leave, and it was then decided that Cuinn would replace Middleton as the band's new guitarist, while the band would look for a new bassist instead. Hargett then agreed to stay a little while longer before officially leaving the band, while Cuinn took on guitar. In summer of 2008 bassist Jerrod Morgan, whom the band had discovered through YouTube, joined the band.

=== Signing with Rise Records and In Medias Res (2009–2011) ===
On the road, PMtoday made an integral connection with Kentucky band Emarosa. Upon meeting the band, members of Emarosa were given a copy of And Then The Hurricane, according to Emarosa's guitarist Jonas Ladekjaer, greatly influencing Emarosa's 2008 recording of Relativity. The copy was soon passed to Rise Records owner Craig Ericson who went into further signing talks in 2009. According to both PMtoday's and Rise Records' official MySpace pages, they signed with indie label Rise Records on May 26, 2009. They started recording In Medias Res on September 22, 2009, and finished on October 25, 2009. The album was released on April 6, 2010 to generally positive reviews.

In their music video for "Don't Exist", a child sits next to a picture frame displaying home-made video clips of adolescence. These clips are actual video recordings of the bandmembers as children and are central to the message of the song, according to the band.

=== Break-up (2011) ===
According to an interview with PunkWorldViews.com, PMtoday were already writing new material on the road and would expect to be able to record another album in 2012, and stated that it was going to be different than anything they had done in the past. However, at the time there were rumors circulating on the internet that the band were going to break up. This rumor spread when they put up ads, selling their touring van on their Facebook page. Eventually, PMtoday confirmed the rumor by posting a brief statement saying, "To clarify the rumors people are making up. This band is done and is never coming back." It was later rumored that the breakup was due to lack of time for writing new songs to meet Rise Records' deadline for a new album.

=== Move Orchestra (2013-present) ===
On April 17, 2013 Connor and Ryan Brogan (PMtoday's founding members) started a new electronic music project called Move Orchestra. Through Facebook, they announced that they would be recording and posting music over the summer of 2013. In late June, they announced that former member Cuinn Brogan would be joining the project as well. Since then, the line-up has been completed by occasional member Griffin, the Brogans' youngest brother. The band had previously asked former bassist Jerrod Morgan to join, but he declined. Move Orchestra has since released four singles and a self-titled EP.

In June 2014 Pmtoday reunited for one night to do a proper farewell show, as support act for Brand New.

== Musical style and critical reception ==
PMtoday started out playing pop-punk and emo, but since the 2005 release of their second EP, drifted towards a more progressive sound. PMtoday is frequently recognized for their combination of progressive rock, alternative rock and post-hardcore. Thomas Nassiff of AbsolutePunk said that PMtoday "are at their best when they're switching up their sound, going from blistering guitar work to gently woven melodies." He also compared them to Circa Survive, Brand New, and also classified them as indie rock. Adam Thomas of Sputnikmusic said that In Medias Res would "likely end up being one of the best post-hardcore albums to come out in 2010."

The band also made heavy use of alternating, harmonized and counterpoint vocals, with other band members beside Connor also contributing to vocals. In the earliest inception of the band Connor Brogan was the lead vocalist, with Ryan Brogan providing secondary vocals. Justin Coulter provided backing vocals and occasional screamed vocals, and was replaced in 2005 by Kevin Middleton. In their last line-up, this format was expanded to include all four members, although all vocals for In Medias Res were recorded by Connor.

The band's second album, In Medias Res, was met with overwhelmingly positive reviews. Indie Vision Music, who gave the album a positive review, said that "perseverance is not the word that immediately comes to mind when [he] think[s] of most bands; however, when thinking of pmtoday it certainly fits" and said that when he "think[s] of Rise [Records] [he] think[s] of post-hardcore, but [In Medias Res] throws that thinking out the window." They closed the review saying that the "album is a solid Rise debut release and is a must buy for any progressive indie rock fan."

Phil Freeman, a writer for Alternative Press, gave the album a positive review compared PMtoday to the "earliest Mars Volta recordings, before Omar Rodríguez-López decided every flubbed note he recorded deserved its own solo album" due to their "funk rock riffing and blistering tempos." He closed the review with:

These guys are outrageously talented--good-to-great lyricists/songwriters and astonishing musicians (the two don't always go hand in hand). They never settle for screaming and distortion when a more thoughtful approach will yield bigger dividends, but they also hardly ever miss an opportunity to shred. They deserve to be huge; this is one of the best albums of 2010 so far, and a mind-roasting debut.

Chris Marshman, a writer for webzine Alter the Press!, gave the album a positive review, stating that the album starts with a "somewhat dampening opener", referring to "Thoughts In Transit", and comments that a listener "could be forgiven for thinking that [they]’re not in for a very enjoyable listen. Take that stance and [they]’re wrong, because what In Medias Res is, is an album full of twists and turns that any attempt to guess what might be coming up will almost certainly be wrong." He closed the review with

All in all, despite some small inconsistencies, what we have here is a technically outstanding album. [...] Despite the differences in the sounds of songs, it all blends together effortlessly and what could have been a hefty gamble for an album has turned into a resounding success.

Joshua Khan of Ultimate Guitar Archive also gave the album a positive review, stating that "guitarists Connor and Cuinn Brogan shred their way across the disc's ten tracks, transforming indie rock melodies into post-hardcore breakdowns with a hint of pop. The combination seems unrealistic and fake, but the outcome is almost breathtaking. Numerous bands have swayed from progressive rock set in stone by bands such as Coheed and Cambria, and PMtoday rejuvenate it without undertones that are incredibly dark." He also made a note of the track "Don't Exist", stating that it "starts like an indie pop track and turns into a constant battle of melodic riffs. Such unexpected turns are littered throughout the record, along with intense jam sessions reminiscent of [Mars Volta], leaving listeners hanging on to every moment the band conjures a breakdown." He closed the review with:

It doesn't have a polished force behind it like albums from Coheed And Cambria and Circa Survive, but the sophomore full-length from PMtoday does reek of potential. Instead of blatantly talking about girls and trying to make every line rhyme, the band questions listeners with interesting lyrics and a sound that could seem nostalgic even though it was popular less than five years ago. A positive step forward from past material, In Medias Res is a record built around new talent and a sign that progressive rock is indeed still alive.

== Band members ==
Final line-up

- Connor Brogan - lead vocals, guitar (2003–2011)
- Ryan Brogan - drums, vocals (2003–2011)
- Cuinn Brogan - guitar, vocals (2007–2011)
- Jerrod Morgan - bass guitar, vocals (2008–2011)

Former members

- Nick Hargett - bass guitar (2003–2008)
- Justin Coulter - guitar, vocals (2003–2005)
- Kevin Middleton - guitar, vocals (2005–2007)

== Discography ==
=== Studio albums ===
- And Then the Hurricane (Self-released, 2007)
- In Medias Res (Rise Records, 2010)

=== Extended plays ===
- 2004 EP (Self-released, 2004)
- 2005 EP (Self-released, 2005)

== Videography ==
- "Don't Exist" (2010)
