= Michael Kersting =

German record producer, composer and publisher (born 1965)

Michael Bernard Kersting (born December 10, 1965), also known as Grant Michael B., Michael B. and Grand Ma B., is a German record producer, publisher and composer. He has produced artists and bands like Der Wolf, Young Deenay, Sasha, Ben and Max Mutzke.

== Life and career ==
A short time after his high school exams in 1986, Kersting set up his first professional recording studio, 'Click', in the town of Werl, North Rhine Westphalia. At the same time he created Click Publishing, subsuming the two businesses under the name "Clickmusic". He enrolled at the University of Münster to study politics and history while founding his first band, Private Property. In 1989, Kersting signed a record deal with Warner Music in Hamburg. Along with producer Pete Smith he released his first single, "Waiting for the Morning Sun". Due to the lack of commercial success, Kersting subsequently decided to work as a record producer only.

== Producing, composing, publishing ==
In 1993, Kersting managed to enter the German Single Charts, producing the song "Declaration (DipDipDa)" for the group Sir Prize. In the 1990s, he continued to gain critical acclaim and commercial success as a producer, composer, and publisher, working with artists such as Double Impact, German rapper Der Wolf, hip hop artist Young Deenay, Q Connection, and Sasha. After signing with Clickmusic in 1991, German singer-songwriter Sasha achieved his international breakthrough with the single release "If you believe" in 1998, with Kersting and Pomez di Lorenzo writing and producing the song.

Kersting gained further success with the German rockabilly band Dick Brave and the Backbeats in 2003. In co-operation with Offenbach-based record producer Oliver Rüger, he produced German artists like Max Mutzke, Wilson Gonzalez Ochsenknecht, and Rafael Weber from 2005 to 2010. In 2010, Kersting signed German ska punk band Sondaschule. In 2011, he contracted Leipzig-based band Flimmerfrühstück and produced their 2011 record In Allen meinen Liedern, along with Swen Meyer. In October 2011, Kersting released the second Dick Brave and the Backbeats album Rock'n'Roll Therapy, which gained gold record status. In the summer of 2013, he signed Leipzig-based artist LOT. He gained further success with the production of the 2015 album Schön kaputt by Sondaschule.

== List of albums and singles as producer, composer and publisher ==
With Sasha

Albums

- 1998 – Dedicated to …
- 2000 – … You
- 2001 – Surfin' on a Backbeat
- 2004 – Dick This (as Dick Brave and the Backbeats)
- 2006 – Open Water
- 2006 – Greatest Hits
- 2009 – Good News on a Bad Day
- 2011 – Rock'n'Roll Therapy (as Dick Brave and the Backbeats)
- 2014 – The One

Singles

- 1998 – I'm Still Waitin' with Young Deenay
- 1998 – If You Believe
- 1999 – I Feel Lonely
- 2000 – Let Me Be the One
- 2001 – Here She Comes Again
- 2002 – This is My Time
- 2004 – Take Good Care of My Baby (as Dick Brave and the Backbeats)
- 2006 – Coming Home
- 2007 – Lucky Day
- 2009 – Father and Son (with Michael "Bully" Herbig)
- 2011 – Just can't Get Enough
- 2012 – Just the Way You Are
- 2015 – Good Days

with Young Deenay

Alben

- 1998 – Birth

Singles

- 1997 – Walk on By
- 1998 – Wannabe Your Lover
- 1998 – I'm Still Waitin' (with Sasha)
- 1998 – I Want 2 Be Your Man
- 1999 – You and Me (Stay Alive)

with Der Wolf

Alben

- 1997 – Das Album
- 1998 – Musik aus (m)einem Jahrzehnt
- 2000 – Was soll ich sagen …

Singles

- 1996 – Gibt's doch gar nicht
- 1997 – Frau aus Seide
- 1997 – Oh Shit, Frau Schmidt
- 1998 – Dumm gelaufen
- 1998 – Kein' Kuchen da! (Hätt' ich dich heut' erwartet …)

with Ben

Alben

- 2002 – Hörproben
- 2003 – Leben leben

Singles

- 2002 – Engel
- 2002 – Herz aus Glaß
- 2002 – Gesegnet seist du
- 2003 – Kleider machen Leute
- 2003 – Verliebt

Various artists

- 1993: Sir Prize – Declaration (DipDipDa)
- 1994: Ernestine – Keep on Dancin' (Thru the Nite)
- 1995: Ernestine – Do You Really Want My Love
- 1995: Sir Prize – Lullaby of Love
- 1995: Synthax feat. Ayla – Need Your Lovin
- 1996: Sir Prize – Love is the Answer
- 1996: H.I.M. – Lookin' Out 4 Luv
- 1997: Hobo feat. Jill – Star
- 1997: Hobo feat. Muddy Waters – Hoochie Coochie Man
- 1997: Sir Prize – Don't Go Away
- 1999: Q Connection – Java (All Da Ladies Come Around)
- 1999: Q Connection – Where I'm From
- 1999: Q Connection – Bei mir bist du schön
- 2001: Thomas Gottschalk – What Happened to Rock'n'Roll (single)
- 2001: Jack Radics – Always Around (album)
- 2001: Uwe Ochsenknecht – Singer
- 2003: Become One – Don't Need Your Alibis
- 2004: Boppin'B – Bop Around the Pop (album)
- 2004: Boppin'B – If You Believe (single)
- 2004: Jelena Jakopin – True
- 2008: Max Mutzke – Black Forrest (album)
- 2008: Wilson Gonzalez Ochsenknecht – NYC
- 2008: Wilson Gonzalez Ochsenknecht – I'm Fallin'
- 2008: Wilson Gonzalez Ochsenknecht – Cookies (album)
- 2009: Max Mutzke – Marie (single)
- 2010: Sondaschule – Von A nach B (album)
- 2011: Flimmerfrühstück – In allen meinen Liedern (album)
- 2012: Sondaschule – Lass es uns tun (album)
- 2014: LOT – Warum soll sich das ändern (EP)
- 2015: Sondaschule – Wunderschön kaputt (album)
- 2015: LOT – 200 Tage (album)

Film score

- 2001: Wilsberg: Wilsberg und der Mord ohne Leiche
- 2002: The Rules of Attraction

== Links ==
- Website Michael Kersting
- recorded musicmusikmarkt.de
- Official German Music Charts www.gfk-entertainment.com/
- Discography of Michael Kersting
- Pofil: Click music at mediabiz.de, musikwoche.de at April 29, 2009
