= All Beauty Must Die =

Studio album by Krypteria
- Released: April 22, 2011
- Genre: Gothic metal, symphonic metal
- Label: Liberatio Music GmbH

Krypteria chronology
My Fatal Kiss (2009)	All Beauty Must Die (2011)

Singles from All Beauty Must Die
- 1. "You Killed Me" Released: March 21, 2011; 2. "Live To Fight Another Day" Released: March 27, 2011; 3. "Get The Hell Out Of My Way" Released: 2011

All Beauty Must Die is the fourth studio album by the German symphonic metal band Krypteria (released on April 22, 2011), before the band re-invented themselves, changing the band name into And Then She Came.

In the weeks before the release, three songs from the album were made available for free download through the official Krypteria website by signing up for their newsletter. On March 27, a music video for the track "Live To Fight Another Day" followed.

On March 9, the band announced on their website, that for the first time in their band history, the album would contain guest performances by friends of the band. This includes co-lead vocals by Doro on "Victoria" and co-lead guitar by Tobias Exxel of Edguy on the song "Higher".

"The Eye Collector" also samples the "Moonlight Sonata" by Ludwig van Beethoven.

== Reception ==
Professional ratings
Review scores
Source	Rating
Metal Hammer (Germany)	4/7
Sonic Seducer	favourable

All Beauty Must Die peaked at position 24 in the German album charts.

A review by the German Sonic Seducer magazine lauded the album's mix of fast uptempo tracks and slow "atmospheric" pieces as well as the guitar riffs. Also Metal Hammer was positive about the dynamics and the quality of the riffs but criticised the contrast between singer Cho's bright voice and the deep guitar sound.

== Track listing ==
All tracks are written by Krypteria, except where noted.

No.	Title	Length
1.	"Messiah"	3:49
2.	"As I Slowly Bleed"	4:23
3.	"Fly Away With Me"	3:41
4.	"You Killed Me"	3:11
5.	"Live to Fight Another Day"	3:35
6.	"Eyes of a Stranger"	4:15
7.	"Thanks for Nothing"	4:08
8.	"Turn the World Around"	3:23
9.	"Higher"	4:29
10.	"Victoria"	2:58
11.	"(How Can Something So Good) Hurt So Bad"	3:55
12.	"The Eye Collector"	11:21
13.	"Get the Hell Out of My Way 2011"	4:36
14.	"Liberatio 2011"	4:08
15.	"Come Hell or High Water*" (Music based on "Land of Hope and Glory")	3:24

== Credits ==
- Ji-In Cho - Lead vocals & piano
- Chris Siemons - Guitar
- Frank Stumvoll - Bass
- S.C. Kuschnerus - Drums
- Tobias Exxel - Co-lead guitar on "Higher"
- Doro - Co-lead vocals on "Victoria"
