= Ji-In Cho =

German heavy metal singer (born 1976)

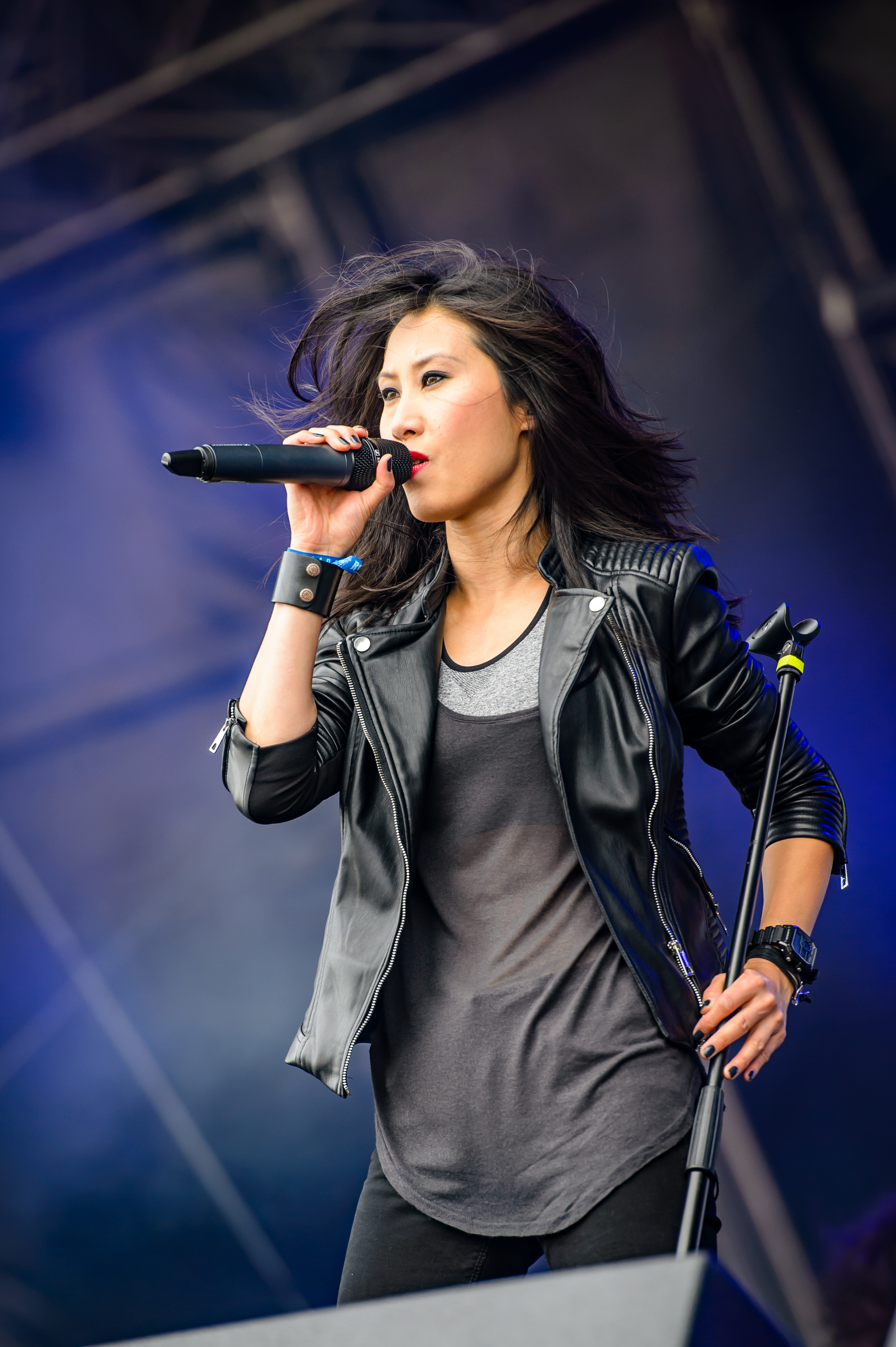
- Ji-In Cho in 2016

Background information
- Born: 30 December 1976 (age 49); Leverkusen, West Germany
- Genres: Power metal, symphonic metal, gothic metal
- Occupation: Singer
- Years active: 2003–present
- Member of: And Then She Came
- Formerly of: Krypteria, Become One

- Ji-In Cho
- Hangul: 조지인
- RR: Jo Jiin
- MR: Cho Chiin

Ji-In Cho (born 30 December 1976) is a German heavy metal singer of Korean descent. She has been the lead vocalist of the symphonic metal band Krypteria since December 2004 until their hiatus after her pregnancy. Following this, the band was reformed as And Then She Came, which consisted of most of the former members of Krypteria before the band reverted back to that name.

== Biography ==
Ji-In Cho began an extensive musical education, including piano lessons, when she was six years old. Later she studied Music (Cologne music academy) and Theology (University of Cologne).

In 2003, Cho was unwittingly registered by a friend to the German edition of the Fame Academy television show for musical talents. For the show she recorded a cover version of Alanis Morissette's song "Ironic" which brought her into the German singles charts. In the end she became a member of the band Become One that was formed by successful contestants of the show.

Since December 2004, Cho has been the lead singer of the band Krypteria, whose single "Liberatio" was used for a charity campaign in aid of the tsunami victims in Southeast Asia. The outcome was proceeds of Euro 11 Million by selling 150,000 singles. "Liberatio" reached the status of a golden record and had the chart position No.3 for many weeks.

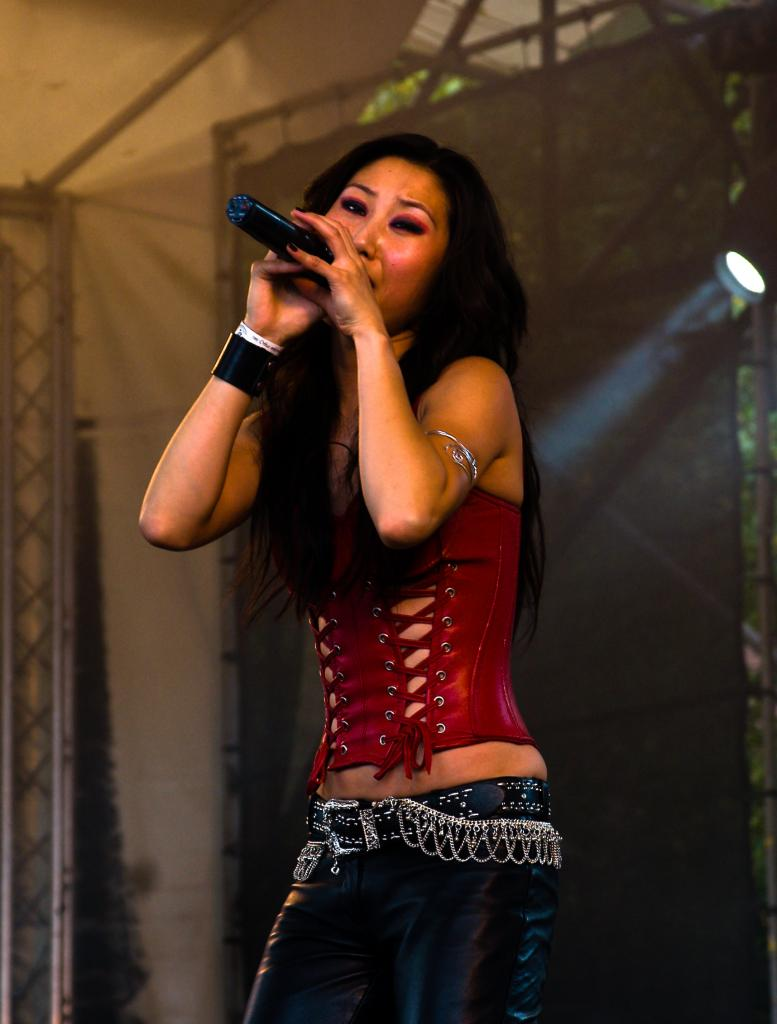
Ji-In Cho at the 2007 Amphi Festival

In 2012, Cho and Krypteria celebrated the birth of her first child, and took a break from live shows.

In 2016, Cho and most of the former Krypteria members formed a new band called And Then She Came.

== Discography ==
=== Solo ===
- "Ironic" (2003), single, Sony/BMG, peaked at #31 in the German charts.

=== With Become One ===
==== Studio albums ====
Year	Album	Peak positions
Year	Album	GER
2004	1	24

==== Singles ====
Year	Single	Peak positions			Album
Year	Single	GER	AUT)	SUI	Album
2003–2004	"Don't Need Your Alibis"	16	33	52	1
2004	"Come Clean"	61	–	–	1

=== With Krypteria ===
==== Studio albums ====
Year	Title	Label	Peak positions		
Year	Title	Label	GER	AUT	SWI
2005	Liberatio	SMM	24	41	25
2005	In Medias Res	Synergy	66	86	—
2007	Bloodangel's Cry	Synergy	55	—	44
2009	My Fatal Kiss	Roadrunner	63	—	—
2011	All Beauty Must Die	Liberatio	24	—	—

denotes an unofficial release

==== EP ====
- Evolution Principle (2006), Synergy Records

==== Singles ====
Year	Title	Peak positions			Album
Year	Title	GER	AUT	SWI	Album
2005	"Liberatio"	3	5	20	Liberatio
2005	"Victoriam Speramus"	89	—	—	In Medias Res
2007	"Somebody Save Me"	—	—	—	Bloodangel's Cry
2009	"Ignition"	—	—	—	My Fatal Kiss
2009	"For You I'll Bring the Devil Down"	—	—	—	My Fatal Kiss
2011	"You Killed Me"	—	—	—	All Beauty Must Die
2011	"Live to Fight Another Day"	—	—	—	All Beauty Must Die
2011	"BVB Meisterhymne 2011"	6	—	—	none, Borussia Dortmund merchandising

denotes an unofficial release

=== With And Then She Came ===
==== Studio albums ====
2016

- And Then She Came
- Bonsoir at The Abattoir (live)
- Live MMXVI (DVD)

2018

- Kaosystematiq

=== With Corvus Corax ===
==== Studio albums ====
2017

- Der Fluch des Drachen
