= My Fatal Kiss =

Studio album by Krypteria
- Released: August 24, 2009
- Genres: Gothic rock, symphonic metal, heavy metal
- Length: 47:47 (standard); 55:57 (digipak)
- Label: Onfire/Roadrunner Records

Krypteria chronology
Bloodangel's Cry (2007)	My Fatal Kiss (2009)	All Beauty Must Die (2011)

Singles from My Fatal Kiss
- 1. "Ignition" Released: July 17, 2009; 2. "For You I'll Bring the Devil Down" Released: 2009

My Fatal Kiss is a studio album by German symphonic metal band Krypteria, released on August 28, 2009. While not a classic concept album it has been observed to deal with ambivalence and man's "inner demons".

On July 17, 2009, the first single, "Ignition", was made available for free download through the official Krypteria website by signing up for their newsletter. A music video then followed for the track "For You I'll Bring The Devil Down."

My Fatal Kiss peaked at position 63 in the German album charts.

== Track listing ==
No.	Title	Length
1.	"Ignition"	04:46
2.	"My Fatal Kiss"	03:08
3.	"Why Did You Stop the World From Turning"	06:04
4.	"For You I'll Bring the Devil Down"	03:32
5.	"Deny"	04:55
6.	"The Freak in Me"	05:38
7.	"Never Say Die"	04:34
8.	"Dying to Love"	03:13
9.	"Shoot Me"	03:40
10.	"God I Need Someone"	03:42
11.	"Now (Start Spreading the Word)"	04:35
12.	"Headfirst Into a Sea of Flames" (Bonus track on the limited digipak version)	04:00
13.	"Too Late, Game Over & Goodbye" (Bonus track on the limited digipak version)	04:10

== Credits ==
- Ji-In Cho - Vocals
- Chris Siemons - Guitar
- Frank Stumvoll - Bass
- S.C. Kuschnerus - Drums
