= Bloodangel's Cry =

Studio album by Krypteria
- Released: 2007
- Recorded: 2006
- Genre: Power metal Symphonic metal Gothic metal
- Length: 60:16
- Label: Synergy Records

Krypteria chronology
Evolution Principle (2006)	Bloodangel's Cry (2007)	My Fatal Kiss (2009)

Singles from Bloodangel's Cry
- 1. "Somebody Save Me" Released: 2007

Bloodangel's Cry is an album by German power metal band Krypteria, released in 2007. It peaked at position 55 in the German album charts and at 44 in Switzerland.

== Reception ==
Professional ratings
Review scores
Source	Rating
Laut.de	favourable
Metal Express Radio	7.5/10
Sonic Seducer	very positive

The album received favourable reviews in Germany, that marked the opulent style and lead singer Ji-In Cho's classically trained voice. The Sonic Seducer magazine called it a "highlight" after the band's EP Evolution Principle and compared the track "Sweet Revenge" to the style of Meat Loaf. Also Laut.de noted the opulent instrumentation. The Norwegian Metal Express Radio wrote "that while not really original, [it] does enough to stand out from the pack."

== Track listing ==
No.	Title	Writer(s)	Length
1.	"All Systems Go"	Cho, Kuschnerus, Siemons	4:11
2.	"The Promise"	Cho, Kuschnerus, Siemons	4:09
3.	"Time to Bring the Pain"	Kuschnerus, Siemons	4:52
4.	"Somebody Save me"	Kuschnerus, Siemons	5:00
5.	"Scream"	Kuschnerus, Siemons	4:28
6.	"Lost"	Kuschnerus, Siemons	4:38
7.	"Out of Tears"	Cho, Kuschnerus, Siemons	3:57
8.	"I Can't Breathe"	Kuschnerus, Siemons	3:22
9.	"The Night All Angels Cry"	Cho, Kuschnerus, Siemons, Stumvoll	6:45
10.	"Dream Yourself Far Away"	Kuschnerus, Siemons	4:00
11.	"Sweet Revenge"	Kuschnerus, Siemons	4:51
12.	"At the Gates of Retribution"	Cho, Kuschnerus, Siemons	10:03

== Credits ==
- Ji-In Cho - Vocals
- Chris Siemons - Guitar
- Frank Stumvoll - Bass
- S.C. Kuschnerus - Drums
