= Hertzton =

German rock/pop/electronica band

Hertzton (stylized HERTzTON) is a German rock, pop and electronica band that was formed in 2001 by author, composer, musician, singer and songwriter Markus Winter. The band is based in Leverkusen.

== History ==
Originally, Winter performed English pop music with CRY, a band formed in 1993. The CRY album "Invisible Tears", released in 1995, included the Belgian radio hit "Longing for Fire". It was not until 2001, when a friend discovered some old recordings in a box and after listening to them, suggested Markus record them 1, that he formed HERTzTON in the same year.

Das Album (The Album) was released the following year with Eiszeit im Paradies becoming somewhat of a local club favourite. Due to a conflict of interests the original lineup disbanded before the official release of Das Album. Winter quickly recruited two new members to complete the line up, Jürgen Zass (bass, backing vocals) and Olaf Ginko (drums). The band completed several tours in 2003 and 2004 to promote Das Album. At the end of 2004, Zass and Ginko would depart the band for personal reasons 1.

It was not until 2006 that Winter, along with session players Jonas Bentin (Keyboards, Programming) and Milly Snow (Drums) did HERTzTON record its second, and most successful album to date, Schattentänzer (Shadowdancer).

In November 2006, HERTzTON'S third and final album to date, Metamorphose (Metamorphosis) was released as a worldwide Download. The album is composed of remixed tracks from the first two albums, arranged in a way to show the band's musical 'metamorphosis' during its four-year existence. A photo montage depicting front man, Winter from 2001 to 2007 adorns the cover and shows his physical metamorphosis during the same time.

The EP Die siebte Sünde (The seventh Sin) was released in August 2007 containing an exclusive remix of Schattentänzer that was done for an audio play series called DiE DR3i that Markus was writing for at the time. The series was stopped after only 8 episodes.

== Discography ==
=== Studio albums ===
- Das Album (2002)
- Schattentänzer (2006)
- Metamorphose (2006)

=== EPs ===
- Die siebte Sünde (2007)
