= In Medias Res (PMtoday album) =

Studio album by PMtoday
- Released: April 6, 2010
- Genres: Progressive rock, post-hardcore, experimental rock
- Length: 38:47
- Label: Rise Records
- Producer: Kris Crummett

PMtoday chronology
And Then the Hurricane (2007)	In Medias Res (2010)

Professional ratings
Review scores
Source	Rating
AbsolutePunk	86%
Alter the Press!	4/5 stars
Alternative Press	4.5/5 stars
Sputnikmusic	4/5 stars
Ultimate-Guitar	7.3/10

In Medias Res is the second and last studio album by progressive rock band PMtoday. The album was released on April 6, 2010. The album's name is a Latin phrase, which literally translates in English to "in the middle of things". It is a reference to the literary technique in which a story begins in mid-action. This album marks the first appearances of guitarist Cuinn Brogan and bassist Jerrod Morgan, replacing former members Kevin Middleton and Nick Hargett respectively.

== Track listing ==
No.	Title	Length
1.	"Thoughts In Transit"	2:22
2.	"People Are Machines"	3:58
3.	"Goodbye, Blue Monday"	3:31
4.	"Progress Is a Lemon"	4:30
5.	"Don't Exist"	4:56
6.	"I Am Wrong"	3:10
7.	"Sad World"	3:42
8.	"Soma Holiday"	2:37
9.	"Composing a Commercial Product"	4:37
10.	"A Convenient Literary Device for Ending Short Stories and Books"	5:24
Total length:		38:47

== Personnel ==
PMtoday

- Connor Brogan – lead vocals, rhythm and lead guitar, keys
- Cuinn Brogan – lead and rhythm guitars, vocals, keys
- Jerrod Morgan – bass guitar, vocals
- Ryan Brogan – drums, percussion, vocals

Production

- Produced, mastered and mixed by Kris Crummett
- Art direction and design by Glenn Thomas
