= In Medias Res (Krypteria album) =

Studio album by Krypteria
- Released: 25 July 2005
- Genre: Symphonic rock, symphonic metal
- Length: 53:50
- Label: Synergy Records / EMI
- Producer: Christoph Siemons

Krypteria chronology
Krypteria (2003)	In Medias Res (2005)	Evolution Principle (2006)

Singles from In Medias Res
- 1. "Victoriam Speramus" Released: 2005

In Medias Res is a studio album by the German symphonic metal band Krypteria, released in 2005. The album was released as an enhanced CD, which includes two video tracks: "Victoriam Speramus", "Get the Hell Out of My Way".

The album name (Latin for Into the middle of things) reflects the fact, that the band considers In Medias Res their first album, while the band has worked together as Krypteria since 2001.

In Medias Res peaked at position 66 on the German albums chart and at position 86 in Austria.

== Track listing ==
All tracks are written by Christoph Siemons and S.C. Kuschnerus, except where indicated.

No.	Title	Length
1.	"Victoriam Speramus (Original Album Ver.)"	3:55
2.	"Will You Be There for Me"	4:43
3.	"Why"	4:43
4.	"No More Lies"	3:45
5.	"Quae Laetitia"	4:38
6.	"Always and Forever"	4:37
7.	"Concordia"	4:01
8.	"Save Me"	3:26
9.	"Animus Liber" (Frank Stumvoll, Kuschnerus)	5:00
10.	"You & I" (Siemons, Ji-In Cho, Kuschnerus)	5:07
11.	"Going My Way"	3:10
12.	"The Tears I Cry" (Siemons, Cho, Kuschnerus)	3:57
13.	"Carol of the Bells" (arr. George Winston, bonus track)	2:48

== Credits ==
- Ji-In Cho – vocals, piano
- Christoph Siemons – guitars, keyboards
- Frank Stumvoll – bass, backing vocals
- S.C. Kuschnerus – drums, backing vocals, lead vocals on "You & I"
