= Gunther Göbbel =

German singer

Gunther Göbbel (Geeno Fabulous) (Geeno Smith)
- Also known as: Geeno; Geeno Fabulous; DJ GF; Geeno Smith
- Born: 6 May 1979 (age 46); Nuremberg, West Germany
- Genres: Pop, dance music
- Occupations: Singer, DJ, record producer, events manager
- Years active: 2003 – present
- Label: Andorfine (2009-present)

Gunther Göbbel (born 6 May 1979 in Nuremberg, West Germany) is a German singer who took part in second season (2003–2004) of Deutschland sucht den Superstar (DSDS) series coming 5th overall in 12 finalist contestants. After a brief time as the duo Meant 2 Be, he became part of the German cover songs duo Lemon Ice as Geeno alongside rapper Jay Low with a string of cover hits like "Stand By Me", "Only You", "Girl You Know It's True" and "Right Here Waiting". After the break-up of the group, he continued his solo music singing career as Geeno Fabulous and DJing (sometimes as DJ GF) and as record producer (under his name Gunther Göbbel). He had a comeback in 2016 with a revitalized version of "Stand by Me" under the new adopted name Geeno Smith.

== In DSDS (2003) ==
Gunther Göbbel applied for the 2nd season of Deutschland sucht den Superstar in 2003. Göbbel did not qualify to the top 13, but was brought back as a "wildcard" and advanced then to final 5 when he was eliminated. His performances during DSDS were:

- Nov. 22, 2003 (1st live show - "My Pop Idol") - Quit Playing Games (With My Heart) from Backstreet Boys - Safe
- Nov. 29, 2002 (2nd live show - "Rock and Pop Ballads) - Careless Whisper from George Michael - Safe
- Dec. 13, 2002 (3rd live show) - "My year of birth") - Don't Stop 'til You Get Enough from Michael Jackson - Safe
- Dec. 20, 2002 (4th live show) - "Christmas") - Santa Claus Is Coming to Town from Tony Bennett - Safe
- Jan. 10, 2003 (5th live show "Elton John / Madonna") - Candle in the Wind from Elton John - Bottom Two - saved
- Jan. 17, 2003 (6th live show "Big Band") - Ain't That a Kick in the Head from Robbie Williams - Bottom Two - saved
- Jan. 31, 2003 (7th live show - "Seventies") - You to Me Are Everything from The Real Thing - Bottom Two - saved
- Feb. 7, 2003 (8th live show - "Movies") - When You Say Nothing at All from Ronan Keating - Eliminated

== Meant 2 Be (2004) ==
Meant 2 Be (M2B)
- Origin: Germany
- Genres: Pop
- Years active: 2004
- Past members: Geeno; Sedat Türüc (of Become One)

After the show, he joined forces with Turkish singer Sedat Türüc who was in the formation Become One to form a duo under the name Meant 2 Be stylized sometimes as M2B. They released one single "Caramba" in September 2004 before splitting up.

== Lemon Ice (2004–2009) ==
Lemon Ice
- Origin: Germany
- Genres: Pop, Dance, Cover versions
- Years active: 2006-2009
- Past members: Geeno; Jay Low
- Website: lemon-ice.de

He founded the record label Utopic Music. In 2006, he formed the German cover duo group Lemon Ice, alongside rapper Jay Low. Gunther Göbbel was on lead vocals and was known as Geeno (at times Geeno Fabulous). The band had a string of hits in Germany and Austria and one hit single in Finland. They also released their debut and only studio album entitled One in 2007 containing many of their earlier cover hits "Stand by Me" (Ben E. King), "Only You" (Yazoo), "Girl You Know It's True" (Milli Vanilli) and "Right Here Waiting" (Richard Marx).

== Solo career (2009–present) ==
After the break-up of the group in 2009, he continued with a solo career named Geeno Fabulous, or just DJ GF. In 2009 he was signed to the German dance club label Andorfine. He released a series of collaborations featuring hip hop artist Young Sixx including I'm Famous (2009), I'm So Horny (2010), That Girl (2011). He was featured in a number of releases of DJ and producer Crew 7 including "This Time" (2010), "Billy Jean" (2011), "I Go to Rio" and "F**k It" (2013). In 2013, he was featured in Crew 7's "Wild", a hit single that reached number 1 in the Deutsche Dance Charts in December 2013. Other releases include the 2011 single "Rhythm Is All That I Need" featuring Raheema.

In the 2010s he worked as a DJ and music producer with his own label Utopic Music. In his hometown of Nuremberg he was a Resident DJ in the Diskothek Goija until it closed in 2015 and then switched to the Indabahn club. Geeno Fabulous was also active in radio mixing launching "Energy Club Royal", a 2-hour radio show on Radio Energy Nürnberg.

In 2011, he co-produced with Christian Greiner, the Chillout Rockerz electronic future jazz album Play for Pleasure. Finest Lounge Music released on Consens Music / Sony Music Entertainment. He was credited as Gunther Göbbel rather than Geeno Fabulous on the recording.

In 2015, he adopted the stage name Geeno Smith and released some songs online like "Future Cybersex", "Simple Sounds" and "I Don´t Wanna Know". In 2016 he appeared on the ZDF show Silvestershow Willkommen 2016 performing a new version of "Stand by Me" which he had recorded together with the Brazilian Pachanga singer Jay del Alma with lyrics partly translated into Spanish and giving the song a Latin twist. The version gained fame and was officially released on January 8, 2016, with his Tropical House mix rising to the top of the iTunes download charts and reaching No. 16 on the Official German Singles Chart.

== Discography ==
(For discography in Lemon Ice, see discography section)

=== Albums ===
Date	Single	Credits	Peak positions
Date	Single	Credits	GER
2014	My Voice	Geeno Fabulous	—

=== EPs ===
Date	Single	Credits	Peak positions
Date	Single	Credits	GER
2009	I'm Famous EP	Geeno Fabulous feat. Young Sixx	—
2010	I'm So Horny EP	Geeno Fabulous feat. Young Sixx	—
2010	This Time EP	Crew 7 feat. Geeno Fabulous	—
2011	That Girl EP	Geeno Fabulous feat. Young Sixx	—
2011	F**k It EP	Geeno Fabulous & Crew 7	—
2011	F**k It (The Mixes) EP	Geeno Fabulous & Crew 7	—
2011	Billy Jean EP	Crew 7 feat. Geeno Fabulous	—
2011	Billy Jean (The Remixes) EP	Crew 7 feat. Geeno Fabulous	—
2013	I Go to Rio EP	Crew 7 feat. Geeno Fabulous	—
2016	Ghostbusters EP	Crew 7 & Geeno Fabulous	—

=== Singles ===
Date	Single	Peak positions
Date	Single	GER
2011	"Rhythm Is All That I Need" (Geeno Fabulous featuring Raheema)	—
2013	"Wild" (Crew 7 feat. Geeno Fabulous)	—
2014	"Dragons Song" (Geeno Fabulous feat. Young Sixx)	—
2015	"Feels so Right" (DJ N'Farmer feat. Geeno Fabulous)	—
2016	"Stand By Me" (Geeno Smith featuring Jay del Alma)	16
