= Der Wolf (rapper) =

German songwriter, disc jockey and musician

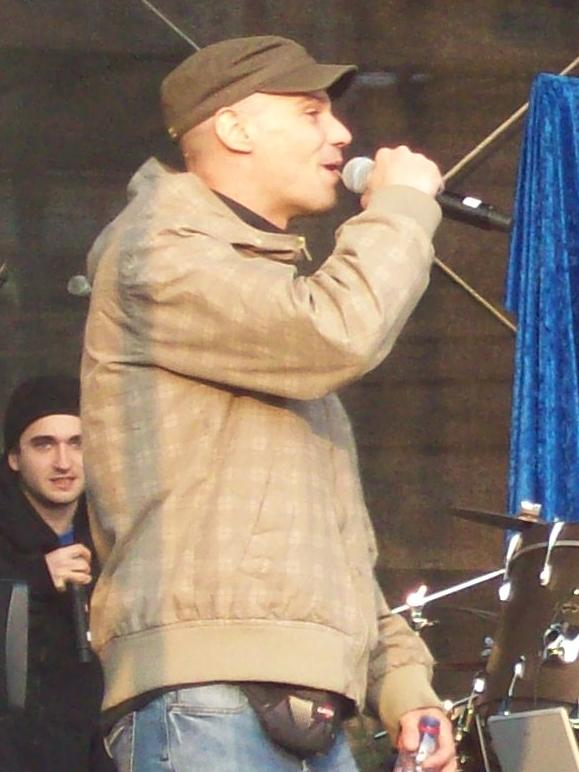

Jens Albert (born 27 September 1973 in Lüdinghausen), better known as Der Wolf, is a German rapper. He was most successful with his charting debut album Das Album in 1996 and singles "Gibt's doch gar nicht" and "Oh Shit - Frau Schmidt".
