= Krypteria =

German rock band

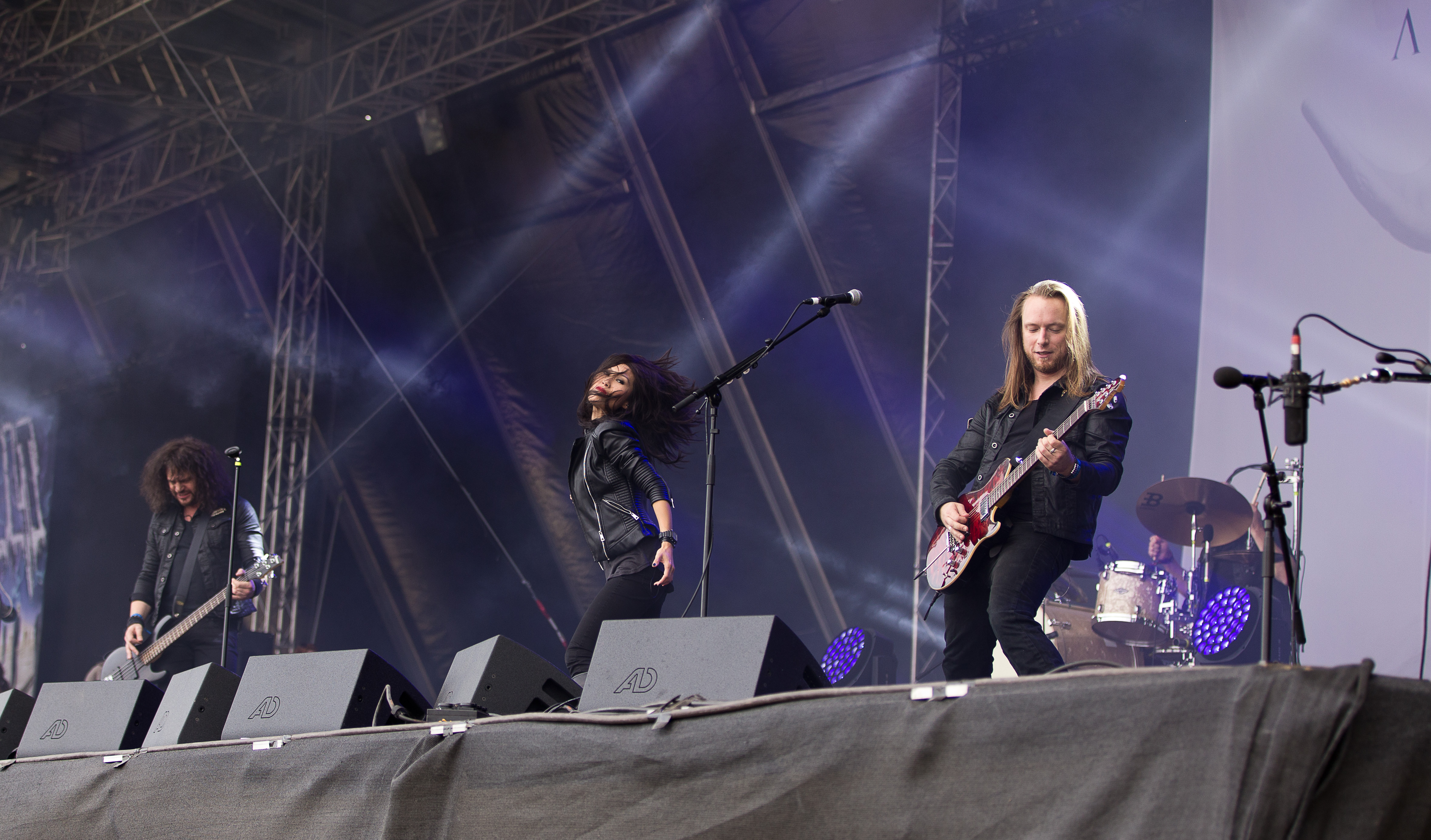
- Krypteria as And Then She Came at Rockharz Open Air 2016

Background information
- Also known as: And Then She Came (2016–2024)
- Origin: Aachen, Germany
- Genres: Symphonic metal, gothic metal, power metal, dark rock
- Years active: 2001–2012; 2016–present
- Labels: Liberatio Music; Napalm Records; Universal Music Group; DME Music
- Members: Ji-In Cho; Chris Siemons; Olli Singer; Frank Stumvoll; S.C. Kuschnerus
- Website: krypteria.de; andthenshecame.com

Krypteria is a German rock band from Aachen. The band was formed as Krypteria, a gothic metal band. Originating from a 2001 "pop musical theatre studio project" of the same name, the idea was to use different vocalists, though German-Korean singer Ji-In Cho assumed the role of lead vocalist in 2004. One self-titled studio album was released under this moniker (later edited and re-released as Liberatio). The group went on hiatus in 2012, reformed as And Then She Came in 2016, and turned back into Krypteria in 2025.

== History ==
In 2001, Chris Siemons and S.C. Kuschnerus worked together to record a fantasy-musical CD. There was no vocalist at that time, because they wanted to record the CD with many different voices. In 2003, the album Krypteria was released. Approximately one year later, in 2004 a tsunami occurred in the Indian Ocean and the German TV station RTL asked them to re-record the song "Liberatio" as a benefit single. Ji-In Cho, was chosen as the lead vocalist for the song and Sony/BMG, decided to re-release an edited version of their first album under the same name.

In 2004, from that project, Krypteria the band was officially born. Although Siemons and Kuschnerus played a leading role in the recording of the album Liberatio, the band does not consider it an official release. A year later their "true" first album, In Medias Res, was released.

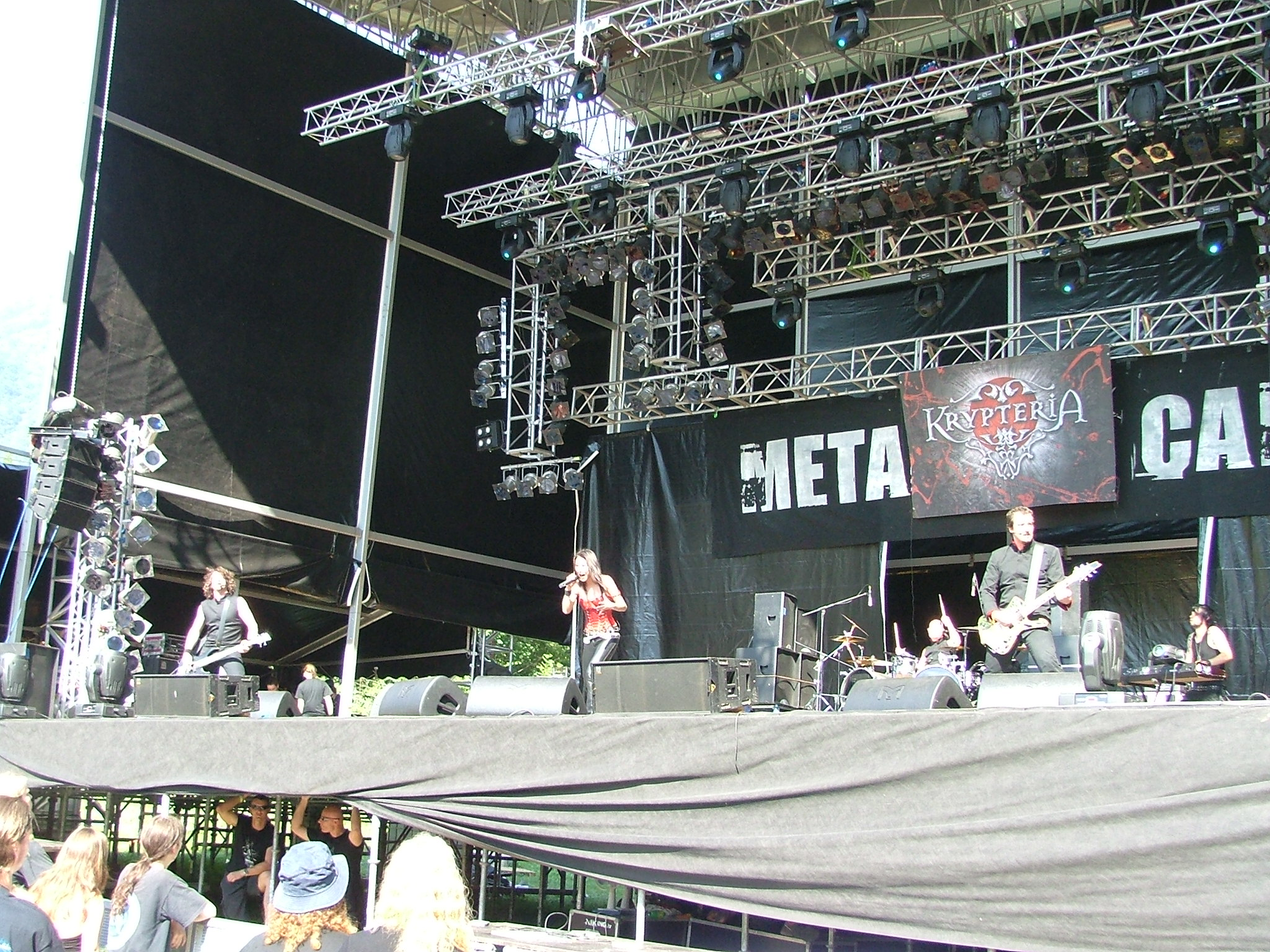
Krypteria performing at Metalcamp in Slovenia, July 2007

Krypteria's second recording was the EP entitled Evolution Principle, released in 2006. A review by the German edition of Metal Hammer marked it as an important release of contemporary gothic metal in Germany.

In January 2007, Krypteria released their second full-length studio album, Bloodangel's Cry. The title comes from the track "The Night All Angels Cry"' lyrics.

In early 2008, the band announced that they were working on their third studio album My Fatal Kiss. The album was released first in Germany on August 28, 2009, then in the rest of Europe on January 29.

The band's fourth studio album All Beauty Must Die was released on April 22, 2011 on the band's own label Liberatio Music. Peaking on position 24 in the German Media Control Charts it is Krypteria's most successful release so far.

It was announced in 2012 that the band would be going on hiatus due to Ji-In's pregnancy.

In 2016, the band was reformed and renamed as And Then She Came, with Olli Singer replacing Chris Siemons as guitarist.

On 16 October 2025, the band released, once again as Krypteria, their new single "A New Dawn".

== Discography ==
=== As Krypteria ===
==== Studio albums ====
Year	Title	Label	Peak positions		
Year	Title	Label	GER	AUT	SWI
2003	Liberatio	SMM	24	41	25
2005	In Medias Res	Synergy	66	86	—
2007	Bloodangel's Cry	Synergy	55	—	44
2009	My Fatal Kiss	Roadrunner	63	—	—
2011	All Beauty Must Die	Liberatio	24	—	—

denotes an unofficial release

==== EP ====
- Evolution Principle (2006), Synergy Records

==== Singles ====
Year	Title	Peak positions			Album
Year	Title	GER	AUT	SWI	Album
2005	"Liberatio"	3	5	20	Liberatio
2005	"Victoriam Speramus"	89	—	—	In Medias Res
2007	"Somebody Save Me"	—	—	—	Bloodangel's Cry
2009	"Ignition"	—	—	—	My Fatal Kiss
2009	"For You I'll Bring the Devil Down"	—	—	—	My Fatal Kiss
2011	"You Killed Me"	—	—	—	All Beauty Must Die
2011	"Live to Fight Another Day"	—	—	—	All Beauty Must Die
2011	"BVB Meisterhymne 2011"	6	—	—	Non-album single

denotes an unofficial release

=== As And Then She Came ===
==== Studio albums ====
- And Then She Came (2016), Napalm Records / Universal Music Group, studio album
- KAOSYSTEMATIQ (2018), DME Music, studio album

==== Live albums ====
- Live – Bonsoir at the Abattoir (2016), live album, recorded at a concert on September 30, 2016 at the Abattoir in Aachen, Germany
- LIVE MMXVI (2016), videoalbum, recorded at a concert on September 30, 2016 at the Abattoir in Aachen, Germany
