= Lemon Ice =

Band that plays pop music

- Origin: Germany
- Genres: Pop, dance
- Years active: 2006-2009
- Members: Geeno (Gunther Göbbel); Jay Low
- Website: lemon-ice.de

Lemon Ice was a German musical duo which released mainly cover versions of songs. It was made up of singer Geeno (real name Gunther Göbbel) and rapper Jay Low. Both originated from Nuremberg.

== Beginnings ==
Under his real name Gunther Göbbel, Geeno reached Final 5 in season 2 of the German Pop Idol series Deutschland sucht den Superstar (DSDS) in 2003/2004 season of. Born on May 6, 1979. Gunther was eliminated in the top 5 round, after receiving 12.58% of the vote. Originally, Göbbel had not advanced to the top 13, but had been brought back as a wildcard and advanced to the Top 5. After the show, Gunther released a Latin-themed single titled "Caramba!" as a part of the duo Meant 2 Be with the German Turkish singer Sedat (full name Sedat Türüc). Gunther Göbbel went on to establish the record label Utopic Music.

After Meant 2 Be, Geeno joined forces with rapper Jay Low whom he met through the live club scene to form Lemon Ice.

== Career ==
Lemon Ice worked with the music producer David Brandes. The debut single of the duo was a hit in Germany and Austria being the cover of single Ben E. King's "Stand By Me". It was released on the label Icezone Music. The accompanying video features Giuliana Marino, German Playmate of the Year 2005. Brandes also managed to place the version on RTL II as background music for the television station's film previews program.

A second single followed, again a cover version of Yazoo's "Only You" with relative success on German, Austrian and Finnish charts. A third single, a cover of Milli Vanilli's "Girl You Know It's True" was a Top 30 hit in Germany.

In 2007 two further singles were released, being covers of Milli Vanilli's "Girl You Know It's True" and Richard Marx' ballad "Right Here Waiting". Both made the German Top 30. With the latter, the band released their debut and only album One containing the 4 singles and many other cover versions.

Their last release was "Hey Lady" featuring Raheema after which the duo separated.

== Discography ==
=== Albums ===

Album and details
Peak positions
Notes
GER

One
- Date released: 28 September 2007
- Record label: Icezone Music
- Format: CD, Album
55
Track list

No.	Title	Length
1.	"Stand by Me"	3:24
2.	"Girl You Know It’s True"	3:17
3.	"Would I Lie to You?"	3:22
4.	"Only You"	3:19
5.	"Right Here Waiting"	4:03
6.	"Say You, Say Me"	4:01
7.	"Call Me Up"	4:28
8.	"Can U Hear Me"	3:37
9.	"I Wanna Know What Love Is"	3:50
10.	"Only One Breath Away"	3:58
11.	"Hello"	3:32
12.	"Don't Stop"	3:39
13.	"Everybody Dance (feat. Dave)"	3:22
14.	"'Cos I Believe"	3:55
15.	"In The Still of the Night"	3:01
16.	"Stand By Me (Video)"	3:24
17.	"Only You (Video)"	3:21
18.	"Girl You Know It's True (Video)"	3:17

=== Singles ===
Date	Single	Peak positions				Album
Date	Single	GER	AUT	FIN	EU	Album
6 Oct 2006	"Stand By Me"	11	23	–	27	One
9 Feb 2007	"Only You"	21	34	6	90	One
27 July 2007	"Girl You Know It's True"	26	-	-	157	One
21 Sept 2007	"Right Here Waiting"	23	-	-	120	One
7 Aug 2009	"Hey Lady" (feat. Raheema)	-	-	-	-	
